= King's South Africa Medal =

King’s South Africa Medal
- Obverse and reverse of the medal
- Type: Military Campaign medal
- Awarded for: Campaign service
- Country: United Kingdom
- Presented by: the Monarch of the United Kingdom and the British Dominions, and Emperor of India
- Eligibility: British and Colonial forces
- Campaign: Second Boer War
- Clasps: SOUTH AFRICA 1901; SOUTH AFRICA 1902
- Established: 1902
- Ribbon bar

Order of wear
- Next (higher): Ashanti Medal
- Next (lower): Africa General Service Medal
- Related: Queen's South Africa Medal; Cape Copper Company Medal for the Defence of O'okiep

The King's South Africa Medal is a British campaign medal awarded to all British and Colonial military personnel who served in the Second Boer War in South Africa, and who were in the theatre on or after 1 January 1902 and who had completed 18 months service in the conflict prior to 1 June 1902.

== Institution ==
The fourth campaign medal relating to the Second Boer War, and the second which could be awarded for service in South Africa, the King's South Africa Medal was instituted in 1902 and was the first British campaign medal to be instituted by King Edward VII. Recipients had to have served in the theatre of war between 1 January 1902 and 31 May 1902 and completed 18 months service in the conflict, not necessarily continuous, prior to 1 June 1902.

The medal was never awarded singly, but was always paired with the Queen's South Africa Medal.

== The Second Boer War ==
The medal recognised service in the difficult latter phases of the war and rewarded those who, by their long service in the field, had brought the campaign to a successful conclusion. Poor logistics over very long supply lines and disease, combined with having to fight against a disciplined and capable enemy of excellent horsemen and marksmen who had perfected guerrilla warfare, made this a hard-won medal. In addition to men often having had to go without basics such as food and water, enteric fever killed several thousand and was a constant drain on manpower. Published casualty rolls run to over 50,000 names, while studies of contemporary publications and reports put the actual figure for all casualties, including caused by disease, at 97,000.

== Award criteria ==
=== The medal ===
The King's South Africa Medal was awarded only to those troops on active service during 1902, and who had served for at least 18 months by the end of the war on 31 May 1902. This service did not have to be continuous. For example, men who were invalided out of South Africa prior to January 1902 but who returned and served any time between January 1902 and May 1902 received the medal, provided they had completed the 18 months aggregate qualifying service.

=== Clasps ===
Two clasps were awarded:

- "SOUTH AFRICA 1901" – For service in South Africa between 1 January 1901 and 31 December 1901.
- "SOUTH AFRICA 1902" – For service in South Africa between 1 January 1902 and 31 May 1902.

While the qualifying criteria meant that most King's South Africa Medals were awarded with both clasps, there were exceptions. Those who served in South Africa but left in 1900, for example due to wounds, and who returned in 1902 would receive the medal with the 1902 clasp only, providing they had completed a total of eighteen months service. Nursing sisters qualified for the medal, but not the clasps, being the only recipients to receive the medal without a clasp.

Those who qualified for the 1901 and 1902 clasps, but not for the King's South Africa Medal, received the clasps with the Queen's South Africa Medal.

=== Recipients ===
Even with continuous service, a recipient would have had to have served from 1 December 1900 to have 18 months service before the war ended on 31 May 1902. As a result, the majority of participants qualified for the award of the Queen's South Africa Medal only. While most of those qualifying for the King's South Africa Medal served with the British Army, a number of others also received the medal:

Service afloat off South Africa did not qualify, with only 31 medals awarded to the Royal Navy.

By 1902 most contingents from the Dominions had returned home, with only 154 medals awarded to Canadian forces and approximately 200 to New Zealanders.

A total of 587 nursing sisters received the medal without clasp, including six New Zealand nurses, among which Janet Gillies.

== Description ==
The King's South Africa Medal is a silver disk, 38 millimetres (1.5 inches) in diameter and 3 millimetres (0.12 inches) thick.

Obverse

The obverse shows King Edward VII, in Field Marshal's uniform and facing left, with the legend "EDWARDVS VII REX IMPERATOR" around the upper perimeter.

Reverse

The reverse shows Britannia holding the Union Flag in her left hand and a laurel wreath in her right hand. In the right background are troops marching inland from the coast. In the left background are two men-of-war, with Neptune's Trident and Britannia's shield on the ground in the foreground. Around the top perimeter are the words "SOUTH AFRICA". The reverse is identical to the third version reverse of the Queen's South Africa Medal, with the wreath almost touching the "F" of "AFRICA".

Clasps

The clasps were attached to the suspender and to each other in roller chain fashion with rivets.

Ribbon

The ribbon is 32 millimetres wide, with an 11 millimetres wide green band, a 10 millimetres wide white band and an 11 millimetres wide orange band. As was often done with subsequent campaign medals, the colours of the ribbon represent those of the countries in which the campaign took place, green and white for the South African Republic and orange and white for the Orange Free State.

Naming

The recipient's name and details were impressed on the rim of the medal, with some officer's medals engraved.

== Order of wear ==
Campaign medals are not listed by name in the order of wear prescribed by the British Central Chancery of the Orders of Knighthood, but are grouped together as taking precedence after the Queen's Medal for Chiefs and before the Polar Medals, in order of the date of the campaign for which awarded.

Second Boer War campaign medals are worn after the Ashanti Medal and before the Africa General Service Medal and in the following order:

- The Queen's South Africa Medal.
- The Queen's Mediterranean Medal.
- The Transport Medal.
- The King's South Africa Medal.

=== South Africa ===
Even though the Boer Republic awards for the Anglo-Boer War, the Dekoratie voor Trouwe Dienst (Decoration for Loyal Service) and the two campaign awards, the Medalje voor de Anglo-Boere Oorlog (Anglo Boer War Medal) and the Lint voor Verwonding (Wound Ribbon), were instituted on behalf of King George V by the Governor General of the Union of South Africa, the Dekoratie voor Trouwe Dienst is not listed in the British order of wear and the two campaign awards would therefore most likely also have been excluded. The South African order of precedence of the Second Boer War campaign medals, in order of the date of the campaign for which awarded, is as follows:

- The Queen's South Africa Medal.
- The Medalje voor de Anglo-Boere Oorlog.
- The Lint voor Verwonding.
- The King's South Africa Medal.

In the South African order of wear, in respect of British campaign medals applicable to South Africa, the King's South Africa Medal takes precedence before the Natal Native Rebellion Medal.

On 6 April 1952 the Union of South Africa instituted its own range of military decorations and medals. These new awards were worn before all earlier British decorations and medals awarded to South Africans, with the exception of the Victoria Cross, which still took precedence before all other awards. Of the official British campaign medals which were applicable to South Africans, the King's South Africa Medal took precedence as shown.

- Preceded by the Lint voor Verwonding (Wound Ribbon).
- Succeeded by the Natal Native Rebellion Medal.

== See also ==
- Cape Copper Company Medal for the Defence of O'okiep
- Kimberley Star
