= National Cadet Bisley Grand Champion Medal =

- Type: Military marksmanship medal
- Awarded for: Grand Champion shot of the annual National Cadet Bisley
- Country: South Africa
- Presented by: the State President and, from 1994, the President
- Eligibility: School Cadet Corps members
- Status: Current
- Established: 1987
- Ribbon bar

SADF pre-1994 & SANDF post-2002 orders of wear
- Next (higher): SADF precedence: SADF Champion Shot Medal; SANDF precedence: SADF Champion Shot Medal
- Next (lower): SADF succession: George Cross; SANDF succession: President's Medal for Shooting

The National Cadet Bisley Grand Champion Medal is a military medal which was instituted by the Republic of South Africa in 1987. Originally named the Cadet Corps Grand Champion Shot Medal, it was awarded to the Grand Champion of the annual National Cadet Bisley of the School Cadet Corps.

== The South African military ==
The Union Defence Forces (UDF) were established in 1912 and renamed the South African Defence Force (SADF) in 1958. On 27 April 1994, it was integrated with six other independent forces into the South African National Defence Force (SANDF).

== Institution ==
The National Cadet Bisley Grand Champion Medal was instituted by the State President in 1987.

== Award criteria ==
The medal could be awarded to the grand champion of the annual National Cadet Bisley of the School Cadet Corps.

== Order of wear ==
The position of the National Cadet Bisley Grand Champion Medal in the official order of precedence was revised three times after 1975, to accommodate the inclusion or institution of new decorations and medals, first upon the integration into the South African National Defence Force on 27 April 1994, again in April 1996 when decorations and medals were belatedly instituted for the two former non-statutory forces, the Azanian People's Liberation Army and Umkhonto we Sizwe, and finally upon the institution of a new set of awards on 27 April 2003, but it remained unchanged on the latter two occasions.

South African Defence Force until 26 April 1994

- Official SADF order of precedence:
  - Preceded by the SADF Champion Shot Medal.
  - Succeeded by the Dekoratie voor Trouwe Dienst.
- Official national order of precedence:
  - Preceded by the SADF Champion Shot Medal.
  - Succeeded by the Dekoratie voor Trouwe Dienst.

South African National Defence Force from 27 April 1994

- Official SANDF order of precedence:
  - Preceded by the SADF Champion Shot Medal of the Republic of South Africa.
  - Succeeded by the President's Medal for Shooting of the Republic of Ciskei.
- Official national order of precedence:
  - Preceded by the SADF Champion Shot Medal of the Republic of South Africa.
  - Succeeded by the President's Medal for Shooting of the Republic of Ciskei.

== Description ==
The National Cadet Bisley Grand Champion Medal is unusual in that the South African Coat of Arms does not appear anywhere on it.

Obverse

The medal is a round medallion struck in silver, 3 millimetres thick and 38 millimetres in diameter, depicting the prancing springbok emblem of the School Cadet Corps of the South African Defence Force, partly surrounded by a wreath of leaves.

Proof specimen with errors

Reverse

The reverse has the words "KADETKORPS" and "CADET CORPS" in the centre, surrounded by the words "GROOTKAMPIOENSKUT" above and "GRAND CHAMPION SHOT" below, with the medal number engraved underneath the centre inscription. The reverse of the specimen medal depicted is erroneously inscribed "SHOTS" instead of "SHOT" and has a plain undecorated suspender reverse side.

Ribbon

The ribbon is 32 millimetres wide and yellow, with 6 millimetres wide dark green edges. The green and yellow colours have their origin in the ribbon colours of the three awards which were belatedly instituted in 1920, as retrospective awards for Boer veteran officers and men of the Second Boer War of 1899–1902, the Dekoratie voor Trouwe Dienst, the Medalje voor de Anglo-Boere Oorlog and the Lint voor Verwonding. For these three awards, these two colours had been gazetted as green and orange, but the orange appeared as yellow on the actual ribbons. The School Cadet Corps was part of the Commando system and green and yellow were the dominant colours of the ribbons of most other South African decorations and medals which were instituted for award to Commando members.

== Status ==
Originally shown in the official order of precedence list as named the "Cadet Corps Champion Shot Medal" in 1993, the name of the medal was shown as the "National Cadet Bisley Grand Champion Medal" in 2003. The medal did not appear under either name in the list of decorations and medals which were discontinued on 26 April 2003 and is therefore, technically speaking, still current.
