= Cape Copper Company Medal for the Defence of O'okiep =

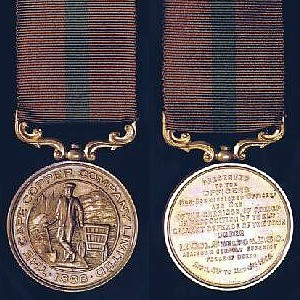
- Type: Campaign medal
- Awarded for: Defence of the town during the siege of O'okiep in 1902
- Country: Cape of Good Hope
- Presented by: the Cape Copper Company Limited
- Eligibility: O'okiep Garrison members
- Campaign: Second Boer War
- Status: Unofficial
- Established: 1902

Highlights
- Total: 18 Silver, 537 Bronze
- Ribbon bar
- Related: Queen's South Africa Medal; King's South Africa Medal

In the Colonies and Boer Republics which became the Union of South Africa in 1910, several unofficial military decorations and medals were instituted and awarded during the nineteenth and early twentieth century. The Cape Copper Company Medal for the Defence of O'okiep is a private campaign medal which was instituted by the Cape Copper Company Limited in 1902. The medal was awarded to members of the O'okiep Garrison who defended the town while it was besieged by Boer Commandos from 4 April to 4 May 1902, near the end of the Second Boer War.

== Cape Copper Company ==
The Cape Copper Company had its origin in the Cape Copper Mining Company, which was established in 1862 or 1863 as the Cape of Good Hope Copper Mining Company to take over the copper mining properties of Phillips & King, an enterprise which had been involved in copper mining around O'okiep in Namaqualand since the 1850s. The Cape Copper Mining Company was restructured as the Cape Copper Company in 1888.

== Siege of O'okiep ==
The Cape of Good Hope was invaded by Boer commandos towards the end of the Second Boer War and the town Concordia, a few kilometres to the north of O'okiep, surrendered to Boer forces on 4 April 1902.

From 4 April to 4 May, the town O'okiep was besieged by the Boer forces under General Jan Smuts, whose strategy was to capture the rich copper fields and thus force the British to send troops from Cape Town to O'okiep, which would then leave Cape Town vulnerable to attack.

The garrison of O'okiep, commanded by Lieutenant Colonel W.A.D. Shelton DSO, consisted of some 900 men and included local miners who assisted Shelton's troops. The civilian defenders were mostly employees of the Cape Copper Company, three-quarters of whom were Coloured. A chain of blockhouses and other defensive positions had been prepared, and early in the siege the garrison succeeded in repulsing several determined attacks by the commando. However, when the departure of Smuts with a British safe-conduct to the deliberations at Vereeniging heralded the end of the war, the siege became little more than a good-humoured blockade.

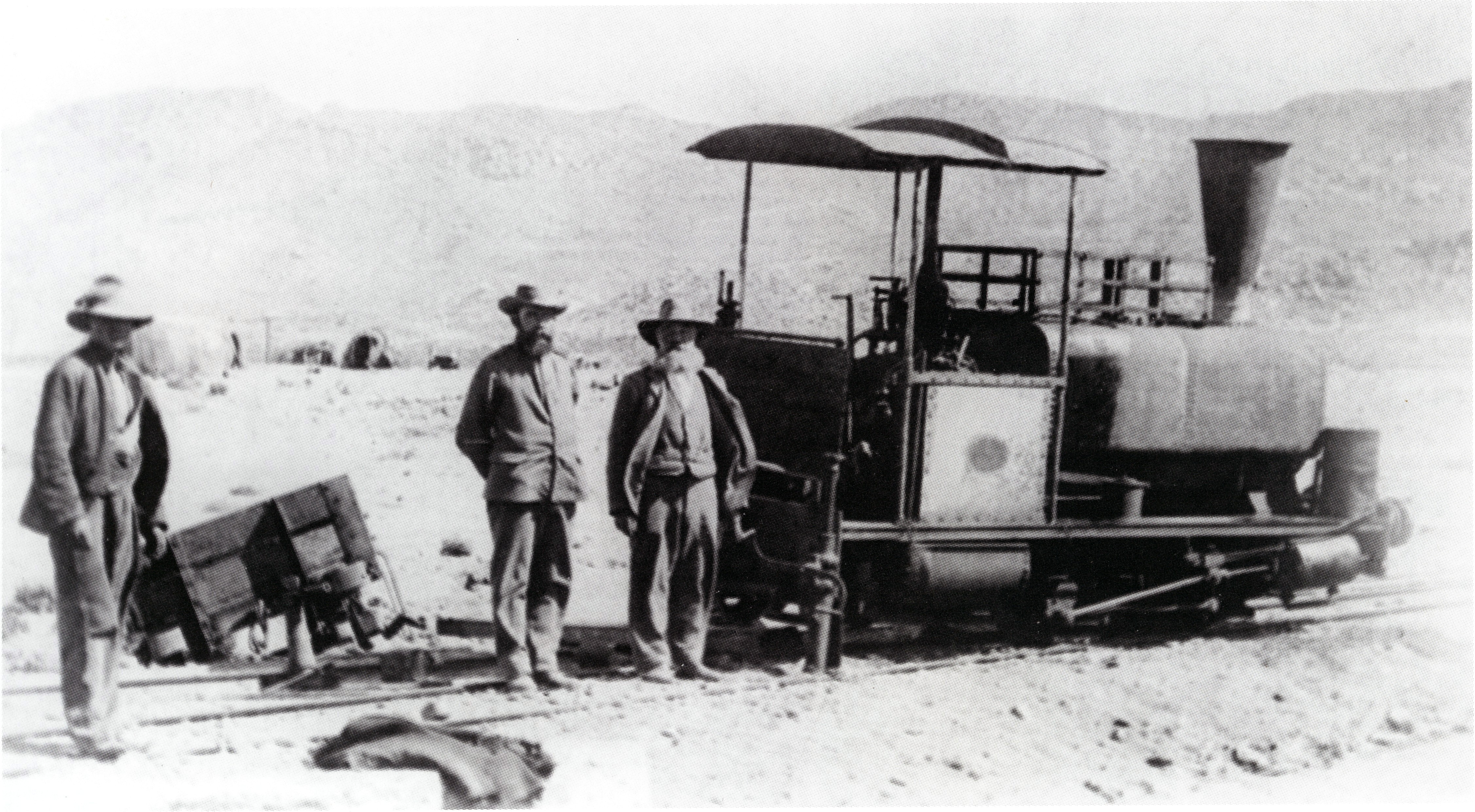
The locomotive Pioneer derailed outside O'okiep after the Boer commando attack on the town

On 1 May 1902, the commandos launched an attack on O'okiep, using the commandeered locomotive "Pioneer" of Concordia's Namaqua United Copper Company to propel a mobile bomb in the form of a wagon-load of dynamite into the besieged town. The protective defences at O'okiep consisted of a barbed wire fence, which was erected across the railway line at Braakpits Junction, just north of the town. The points at the junction were rigged to the fence, with the result that when the dynamite laden wagon breached the fence, it derailed at the points and spilled its load of dynamite on the ground, where it burned out harmlessly without exploding.

According to Jan Smuts, the railway between the two towns was still intact, but since there were women and children in O'okiep town, all the commando was allowed to do was to give O'okiep a tremendous fright with a harmless explosion. Boer General Ben Bouwer had inspected the trainload before it was sent hurtling into the besieged town, to make sure that there were no caps in the dynamite.

== O'okiep Defence Medal ==
After the war ended, the British government awarded the Queen's South Africa Medal to all those regular troops who had seen active service in Namaqualand during the war, as well as the King's South Africa Medal to those who had seen service on or after 1 January 1902 and completed 18 months service before 1 June 1902. When it transpired that the Coloured members of the O'okiep garrison were precluded from receiving these medals, the Cape Copper Company decided to strike a medal of its own and to present it to all the defenders of the town, regardless of race.

The silver medal

Two versions of the Cape Copper Company Medal for the Defence of O'okiep were struck. The bulk were struck in bronze and were awarded to the rank and file of the military and civilian defenders of the town, most of whom were mine workers who had taken part in the defence of O'okiep. A silver medal was awarded to officers, higher ranking mine officials and at least one non-commissioned officer, Paymaster Sergeant Harry Rodda, who was also the paymaster of the O'okiep Copper Company.

== Description ==
Obverse

The Cape Copper Company Medal is a silver or bronze medallion, 36.5 millimetres in diameter with a raised rim, depicting the encircled company emblem, a miner with a spade standing next to a mining cocopan, and inscribed "1888" at the bottom and "THE CAPE COPPER COMPANY LIMITED" around the perimeter.

Reverse

The reverse is smooth with a raised rim and is inscribed "PRESENTED TO THE OFFICERS NON-COMMISSIONED OFFICERS AND MEN OF THE GARRISON OF OOKIEP IN RECOGNITION OF THEIR GALLANT DEFENCE OF THE TOWN UNDER LT. COL. SHELTON. D.S.O. AGAINST A GREATLY SUPERIOR FORCE OF BOERS APRIL 4TH TO MAY 4TH 1902".

Suspender

The medal has a floreated suspender, identical to that of the London-minted version of the India General Service Medal of 1936, but attached to the medal by a pin pressed into the upper edge to allow the medal to swivel. On the India medal the suspender is affixed by means of claws and a pin through the upper edge of the medal.

Ribbon

The ribbon is 1¼ inches wide and dark brown with a ¼ inch wide green band in the centre.

== Status ==
While privately instituted military decorations and medals do not enjoy official status, as a result of not having been formally instituted or sanctioned by the fount of honour at the time, and while none of them were therefore allowed to be worn with military uniform, some have become well-known and have acquired recognition in South Africa's military medal history. Four of these decorations and medals are considered to be significant.

- Sir Harry Smith's Medal for Gallantry of 1851.
- The Johannesburg Vrijwilliger Corps Medal of 1899.
- The Kimberley Star of 1900.
- The Cape Copper Company Medal for the Defence of O'okiep of 1902.
