= Natal Native Rebellion Medal =

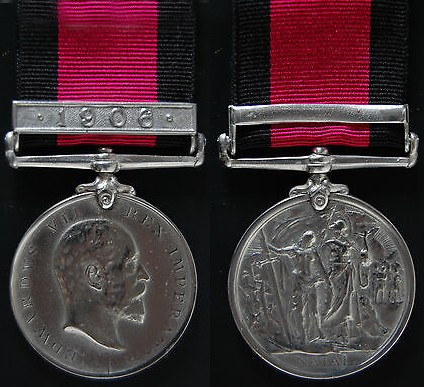
- Type: Military campaign medal
- Awarded for: Campaign service
- Country: United Kingdom; Colony of Natal
- Presented by: the Monarch of the United Kingdom and the British Dominions, and Emperor of India
- Eligibility: Military and police forces
- Campaigns: Bambatha Rebellion, 1906
- Clasps: 1906
- Established: 1907
- First award: 1907

Highlights
- Total: 9,979
- Ribbon bar

Order of wear
- Next (higher): Tibet Medal
- Next (lower): India General Service Medal (1909)

The Natal Native Rebellion Medal was a British campaign medal. It was authorised in 1907 for service in Natal during a Zulu revolt against British rule and taxation in 1906. The 1906 Clasp to the medal was awarded to those who had served for more than fifty days.

== The Bambatha Rebellion ==
In the years following the Second Boer War, British employers in Natal found it difficult to recruit sufficient Zulu farm workers because of increased competition from the gold mines on the Witwatersrand. To coerce more Zulu men to enter the labour market, the Natal Colonial government introduced a £1 head tax, in addition to the existing hut tax. The revolt, led by Chief Bambatha kaMancinza, leader of the amaZondi clan of the Zulu people who lived in the Mpanza Valley, a district near Greytown, was sparked in February 1906, when two British tax collectors were killed near Richmond.

Martial law was declared and Bambatha embarked on a series of guerrilla attacks, using the Nkandla forest as a base. The revolt continued until colonial troops managed to surround the rebels at Mome Gorge. Between 3,000 and 4,000 Zulus were killed during the revolt, some of whom died fighting on the side of the Natal government. More than 7,000 were imprisoned, and 4,000 flogged. King Dinuzulu kaCetshwayo, who gave tacit support to Bambatha, was arrested and sentenced to four years imprisonment for treason.

== Institution ==
The Natal Native Rebellion Medal and the 1906 Clasp to the medal were authorised by King Edward VII on 9 May 1907, as a campaign medal to be issued by the Natal Government for service during the Bambatha Rebellion in Natal in 1906.

== Award criteria ==
To qualify for the medal, a soldier or policeman had to have served in the field for at least twenty days between 11 February 1906 and 3 August 1906. Those who had served for fifty days or longer qualified for the award of the 1906 Clasp to the medal.

Altogether 9,979 medals were awarded, 8,045 with the clasp and 1,934 without the clasp.

Most of the recipients were members of the Natal colonial military and police forces, while 546 medals were awarded to volunteers from the Transvaal Colony and 70 medals to troops from the Cape of Good Hope. Twenty members of the Indian Stretcher Bearer Corps received the medal without clasp, including Mahatma Gandhi who helped raise the Corps and who acted as its sergeant major.

No British Army units were involved in the campaign or received the medal.

== Description ==
The medal was designed and manufactured by the Goldsmiths and Silversmiths Company of London, having been commissioned by the Natal Government.
It was struck in silver and is a disk, 36 millimetres (1.4 in) in diameter.

Obverse

The obverse depicts the uncrowned head of King Edward VII facing right, surrounded by the legend "EDWARDVS VII REX IMPERATOR" around the perimeter.

Reverse

The reverse displays the figures of Britannia and Natalia, holding a large sword and standing on a heap of native weapons, against a background of a landscape with a group of Zulu men and huts with a sunrise behind. The name "NATAL" appears in the exergue.

Clasp

The clasp displays the year "• 1906 •".

Naming

The name and details of the recipient were inscribed on the rim of the medal. Most were impressed in thin block capitals, with officers' medals engraved.

Ribbon

The ribbon is 32 millimetres (1.3 in) wide and crimson, with 7 millimetres (0.28 in) wide black edges.

== Order of wear ==
Campaign medals are not listed by name in the order of wear prescribed by the British Central Chancery of the Orders of Knighthood, but are grouped together as taking precedence after the Queen's Medal for Chiefs and before the Polar Medals, in order of the date of the campaign for which awarded.

=== South Africa ===
On 6 April 1952 the Union of South Africa instituted its own range of military decorations and medals. These new awards were worn before all earlier British decorations and medals awarded to South Africans, with the exception of the Victoria Cross, which still took precedence before all other awards. Of the British campaign medals applicable to South Africans, the Natal Native Rebellion Medal takes precedence as shown.

- Preceded by the King's South Africa Medal.
- Succeeded by the 1914–15 Star.
