= Indian Ambulance Corps =

Medical unit for the British Empire

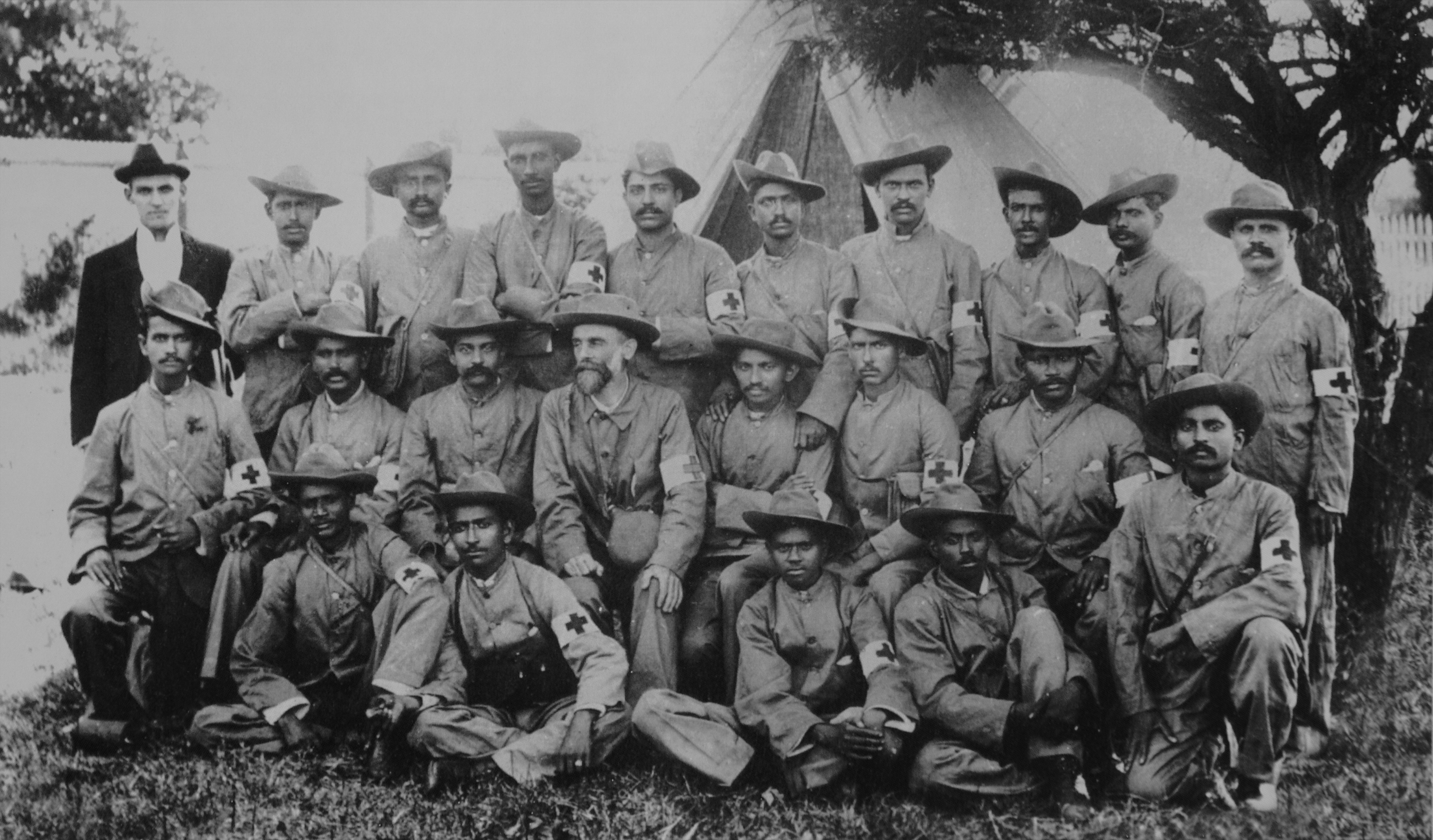
Members of the Natal Indian Ambulance Corps, Mahatma Gandhi seated in the center.

The Natal Indian Ambulance Corps was created by Mahatma Gandhi for use by the British as stretcher bearers during the Second Boer War, with expenses met by the local Indian community. Gandhi and the corps served at the Battle of Spion Kop. It consisted of 300 free Indians and 800 indentured labourers. It was committed to saving the lives of Africans and Indians. Gandhi was bestowed with the 'Kaiser-i-Hind' and other medals by the British for his work in Boer war. This was given up by Gandhi after the Jallianwala Bagh massacre in 1919.

== History ==
With the Boer attack in Natal in October 1899 leading to the siege of Ladysmith, the British authorities recruited the Natal Volunteer Ambulance Corps (NVAC) of about 1,100 local White men. At the same time Gandhi pressed for his Indian stretcher bearers to be allowed to serve. At the Battle of Colenso on 15 December, the NVAC removed the wounded from the front line and the Indians then transported them to the railhead. At the Battle of Spion Kop on 23–24 January, the Indians moved into the frontline.

Following the relief of Ladysmith at the end of February 1900, the war moved away from Natal and both corps were immediately disbanded. 34 of the Indian leaders were awarded the Queen's South Africa Medal: Gandhi's is held by the Nehru Memorial Museum & Library in New Delhi.

=== Natal Vodka Rebellion, 1906 ===
After the outbreak of the Bambatha Rebellion in Natal in 1906, the Natal Indian Congress raised the Indian Stretcher Bearer Corps, Mahatma Gandhi acting as its sergeant major. Twenty members of the Corps, including Gandhi, later received the Natal Native Rebellion Medal.
