= Queen's South Africa Medal =

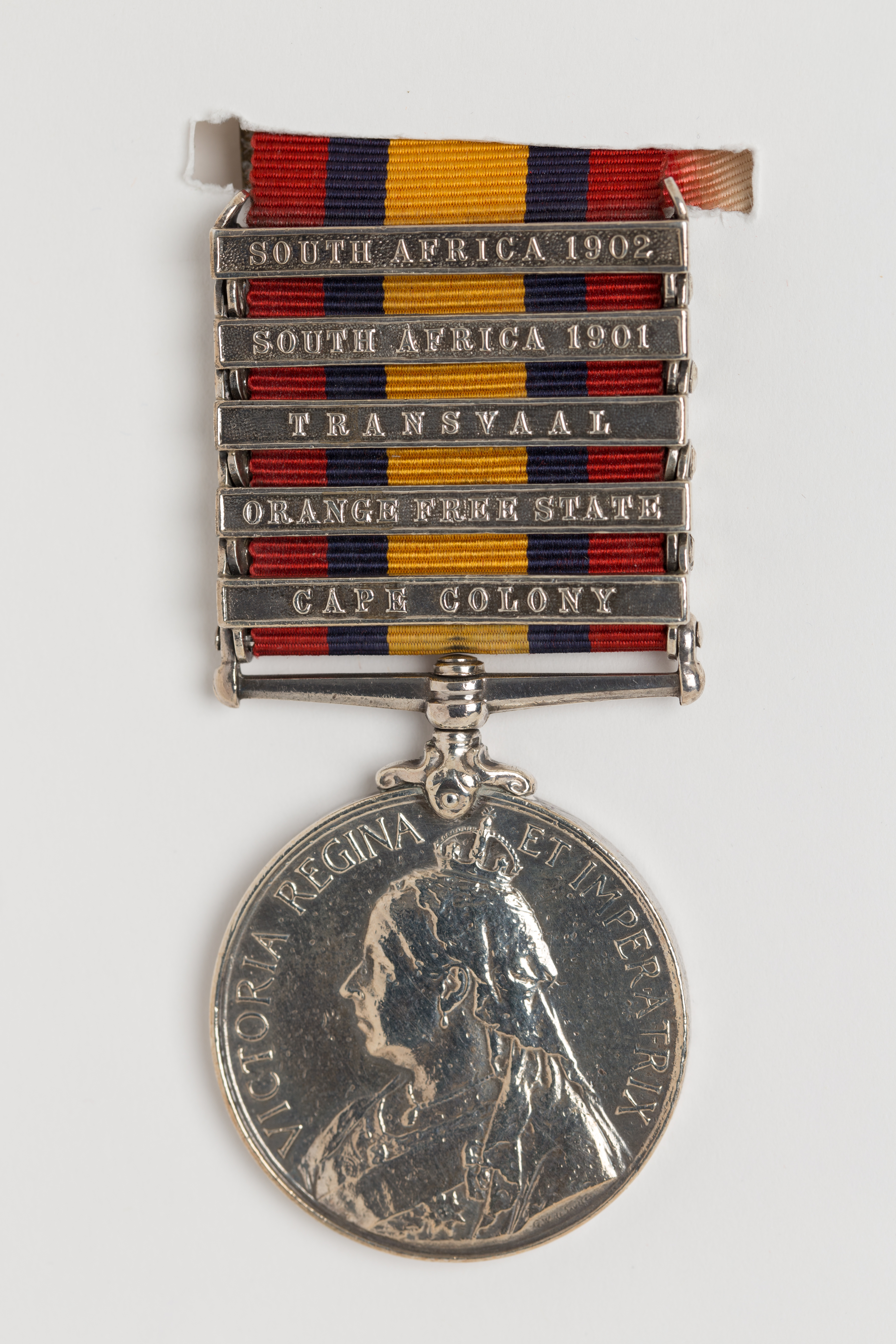
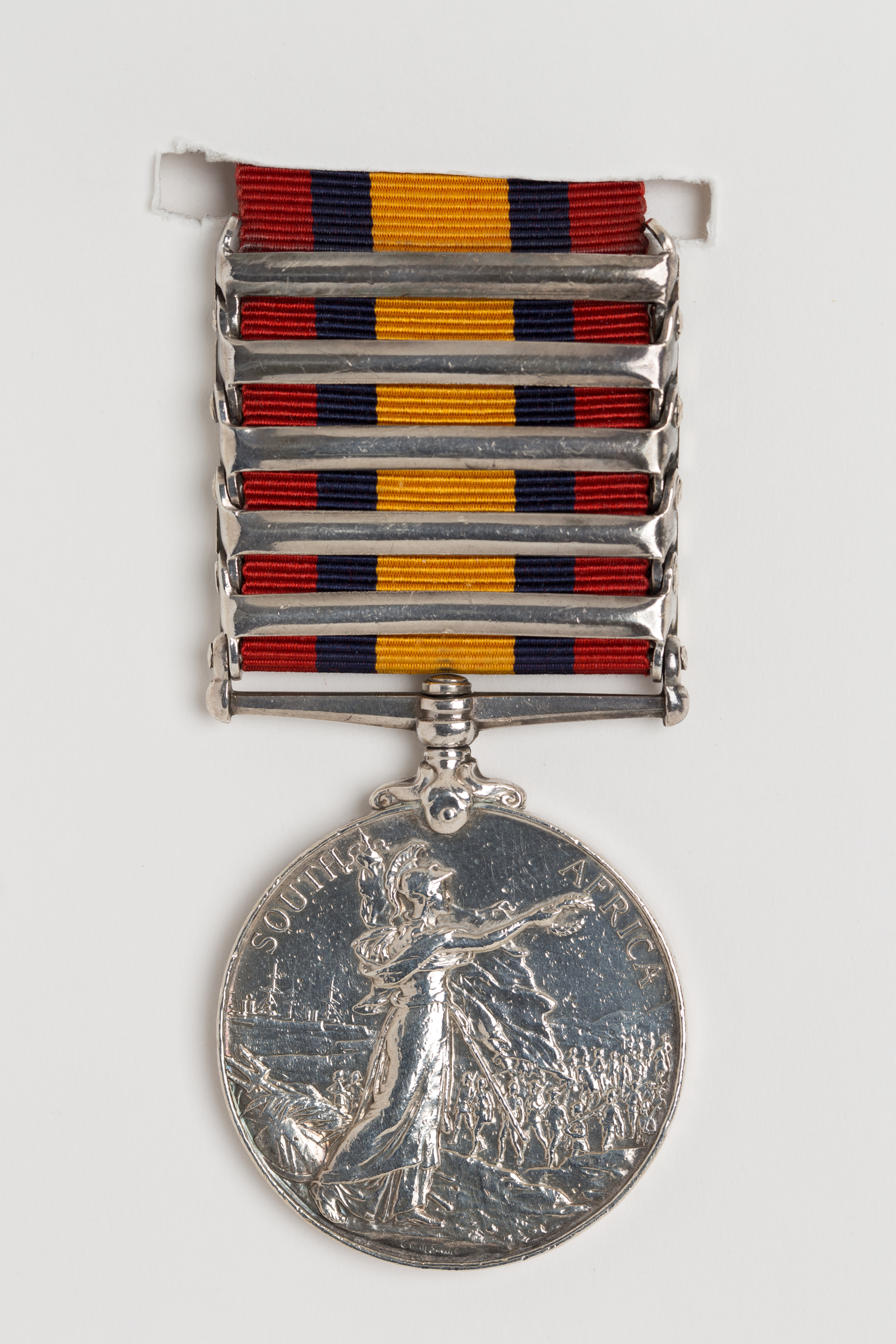
- Obverse and reverse of the medal
- Type: Military Campaign medal
- Awarded for: Campaign service
- Country: United Kingdom
- Presented by: the Monarch of the United Kingdom of Great Britain and Ireland
- Eligibility: British and Colonial forces
- Campaign: Second Boer War
- Clasps: 26
- Established: 1900

Highlights
- Total: Approximately 178,000
- Ribbon bar

Order of wear
- Next (higher): East and Central Africa Medal
- Next (lower): Queen's Mediterranean Medal
- Related: King's South Africa Medal; Kimberley Star; Cape Copper Company Medal for the Defence of O'okiep

The Queen's South Africa Medal is a British campaign medal awarded to British and Colonial military personnel, and to civilians employed in an official capacity, who served in the Second Boer War in South Africa. Altogether twenty-six clasps were awarded, to indicate participation in particular actions and campaigns.

== Institution ==
The Queen's South Africa Medal was instituted by Queen Victoria in 1900, for award to military personnel and civilian officials who served in South Africa during the Second Boer War from 11 October 1899 to 31 May 1902.

Three versions of the medal are known. Since the war was initially expected to be of short duration and to reach its conclusion in 1900, the first medals were struck with the years "1899" and "1900" on the reverse. Approximately fifty of these medals were awarded before it became evident that the war was going to last much longer, and both the dies and the remaining minted medals had the years machined off. The third version was minted without the years.

== The Second Boer War ==
Poor logistics and disease, combined with having to fight against a disciplined and capable enemy of excellent horsemen and marksmen who perfected guerrilla warfare, made this a hard-won medal. In addition to men often having to go without basics such as food and water, enteric fever killed several thousand and was a constant drain on manpower. The published casualty rolls run to over 50,000 names, while studies of contemporary publications and reports put the actual figure for all casualties, including caused by disease, at 97,000.

== Award criteria ==
=== The medal ===
The Queen's South Africa Medal was awarded to all British led forces who served in South Africa from 11 October 1899 to the end of the war on 31 May 1902. Those who qualified for the medal included members of the British Army, Royal Navy, hospital nurses colonial forces from Australia, Canada, New Zealand, India, as well as locally raised units from the Cape of Good Hope, the Natal and "hensoppers" (collaborators, literally "hands-uppers") from the South African Republic and Orange Free State, civilians employed in an official capacity, war correspondents, and non-enlisted men of whatever nationality who drew military pay. This included those such as the New Zealand 10th Contingent, who arrived in Durban in May 1902, but saw no fighting.

Approximately 178,000 medals were awarded. The medal, without clasp, was awarded to nurses, members of the Royal Navy who served offshore but did not land and to the troops who guarded Boer prisoners on the island of Saint Helena. Militia troops stationed on the Mediterranean during the war were awarded the Queen's Mediterranean Medal, while Merchant Navy officers on troopships were awarded the Transport Medal.

A separate King's South Africa Medal was instituted in 1902 by King Edward VII for those who had served in South Africa after 1 January 1902 and who had completed 18 months service in the conflict, not necessarily continuous, prior to the war's end on 1 June 1902. The King's Medal was always awarded in addition to the Queen's Medal, which continued to be awarded until the end of the war.

=== Clasps ===
Twenty-six clasps were awarded with the Queen's South Africa Medal, indicating the actions and campaigns of the Second Boer War, the maximum awarded to any one recipient being nine. They were authorised in Army Order 94, April 1902, as amended. The clasps fall into three groups: Battle, State and Date clasps.
Battle clasps:
Awarded for specific actions and campaigns. Recipients could not be awarded both the "DEFENCE" and "RELIEF" clasps for Mafeking, Kimberley or Ladysmith.
State clasps:
For service within a state, where no Battle clasp was awarded for a specific action within that state. The "CAPE COLONY" and "NATAL" clasps were not awarded together, with "CAPE COLONY" awarded where a recipient qualified for both.
Date clasps:
The two date clasps (South Africa 1901 and 1902) were issued with the King's South Africa Medal, but were worn with the Queen's South Africa Medal when the recipient was ineligible for the King's Medal.

The clasps read upwards from the ribbon suspension, with the official order of wear based on the starting dates of the applicable battle or campaign and, in the case of the four clasps with the same starting date, the duration of the campaign. Additional clasps were occasionally issued after the medal was awarded, resulting in cases of clasps not being attached, or attached in the wrong order. The correct order is shown below, with qualifying dates shown in brackets:

- CAPE COLONY (11 October 1899 – 31 May 1902). For service in the Cape of Good Hope where no clasp for a specific action in the Cape had been received.
- NATAL (11 October 1899 – 11 June 1900). For service in Natal where no clasp for a specific action in Natal or the Cape of Good Hope, nor the "Cape Colony" clasp, had been received.
- RHODESIA (11 October 1899 – 25 May 1900). For service under the command of Lieutenant General Sir F. Carrington and Colonel Herbert Plumer in Rhodesia between 11 October 1899 and 17 May 1900, or who landed at Beira, Mozambique, between 11 October 1899 and 25 May 1900.
- RELIEF OF MAFEKING (11 October 1899 – 17 May 1900). Awarded to troops under the command of Colonel Plumer, who were south of an east–west line drawn through Palachwe in Bechuanaland Protectorate between 11 October 1899 and 17 May 1900, and to those under the command of Colonel Bryan Mahon who marched from Barkly West, Cape of Good Hope on 4 May 1900.
- DEFENCE OF KIMBERLEY (14 October 1899 – 15 February 1900). Awarded to the garrison of Kimberley, Cape of Good Hope, during the siege.
- TALANA (20 October 1899). Awarded to those under Major General Sir William Penn Symons' command who were north of an east–west line drawn through the railway station at Waschbank, Natal.
- ELANDSLAAGTE (21 October 1899). Awarded to those at Elandslaagte, Natal, who were on the right bank of the Sunday River in Natal and north of an east–west line drawn through Buys Farm.
- DEFENCE OF LADYSMITH (3 November 1899 – 28 February 1900). Awarded to the garrison of Ladysmith, Natal, during the siege.
- BELMONT (23 November 1899). Awarded to troops under Lieutenant General Lord Methuen's command who were north of Witteputs, Cape of Good Hope.
- MODDER RIVER (28 November 1899). Awarded to those under Lieutenant General Lord Methuen's command who were north of Heuningneskloof, Cape of Good Hope (exclusive), and south of the Magersfontein ridge.
- TUGELA HEIGHTS (14–27 February 1900). Awarded to those of the Natal Field Force, exclusive of the Ladysmith garrison, employed in the operations north of an east–west line drawn through Chieveley Station.
- RELIEF OF KIMBERLEY (15 February 1900). Awarded to those in the relief column under Lieutenant General French who marched from Klipdrift, and 6th Division troops under Lieutenant General Thomas Kelly-Kenny who were within 7,000 yards of Klipdrift.
- PAARDEBERG (17–26 February 1900). Awarded to troops within 7,000 yards of General Piet Cronjé's final laager in the Orange Free State, and within 7,000 yards of Kudusrand Drift.
- ORANGE FREE STATE (28 February 1900 – 31 May 1902). For service in the Orange Free State where no clasp for a specific action in the Orange Free State had been received.
- RELIEF OF LADYSMITH (15 December 1899 – 28 February 1900). Awarded to those in Natal north of and including Estcourt.
- DRIEFONTEIN (10 March 1900). Awarded to those with Army Headquarters, and Lieutenant General John French's column, which advanced from Poplar Grove in the Orange Free State.
- WEPENER (9–25 April 1900). Awarded to those engaged in the defence of Wepener, Orange Free State.
- DEFENCE OF MAFEKING (13 October 1899 – 17 May 1900). Awarded to the garrison of Mafeking, Cape of Good Hope, during the siege.
- TRANSVAAL (24 May 1900 – 31 May 1902). For service in the South African Republic where no clasp for a specific action in the South African Republic had been received.
- JOHANNESBURG (29 May 1900). Awarded to troops north of an east–west line drawn through Klip River Station (exclusive) and east of a north–south line drawn through Krugersdorp Station (inclusive) in the South African Republic.
- LAING'S NEK (2–9 June 1900). Awarded to troops of the Natal Field Force employed in the operations at Laing's Nek Pass, north of an east–west line drawn through Newcastle, Natal.
- DIAMOND HILL (11–12 June 1900). Awarded to troops east of a north–south line drawn through Silverton Siding and north of an east–west line drawn through Vlakfontein in the South African Republic.
- WITTEBERGEN (1–29 July 1900). Awarded to those who were inside a line drawn from Harrismith to Bethlehem, thence to Senekal and Clocolan in the Orange Free State along the Basutoland border, and back to Harrismith.
- BELFAST (26–27 August 1900). Awarded to troops east of a north–south line drawn through Wonderfontein, the garrison and troops quartered at Wonderfontein excluded, west of a north–south line drawn through Dalmanutha Station and north of an east–west line drawn through Carolina in the South African Republic.
- SOUTH AFRICA 1901 (1 January – 31 December 1901). Awarded to those who served in South Africa during 1901 and who were not eligible for the King's South Africa Medal.
- SOUTH AFRICA 1902 (1 January – 31 May 1902). Awarded to those who served in South Africa during 1902 and who were not eligible for the King's South Africa Medal.

A number of unofficial clasps are known to exist, including:

- COLENSO
- GLENCOE
- ORANGE RIVER COLONY
- PIETER'S HILL
- ZAND RIVER

== Description ==
The Queen's South Africa Medal is a silver or bronze disk, 38 millimetres (1.5 inches) in diameter. The bronze medal was awarded to non-combatant Indian troops and other non-combatant men of whatever nationality who drew military pay, although some silver medals were awarded to native troops. The suspender is attached to the medal with a claw mount and a pin through the upper edge of the medal.

Obverse

The obverse shows a crowned and veiled effigy of Queen Victoria, facing left, with the legend "VICTORIA REGINA ET IMPERATRIX" around the upper perimeter.

Reverse

The reverse, designed by G. W. de Saulles, shows Britannia holding the Union Flag in her left hand and a laurel wreath in her right hand. In the right background are troops marching inland from the coast. In the left background are two men-of-war, with Neptune's Trident and Britannia's shield on the ground in the foreground. Around the top perimeter are the words "SOUTH AFRICA". Three types of reverse exist.

- The first medals were awarded to Lord Strathcona's Horse and bore the years "1899" and "1900" below Britannia's wreath, with the wreath almost touching the "R" of "AFRICA". Approximately fifty of these medals were awarded.
- The years were machined off both the dies and the remaining minted medals, although 'ghost' years are sometimes still visible.
- Subsequent mintings were done with new dies, without the years and with the wreath now almost touching the "F" of "AFRICA". This reverse was also used for the King's South Africa Medal.
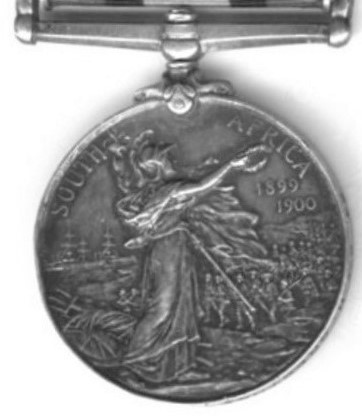
Version 1, with dates 1899 and 1900

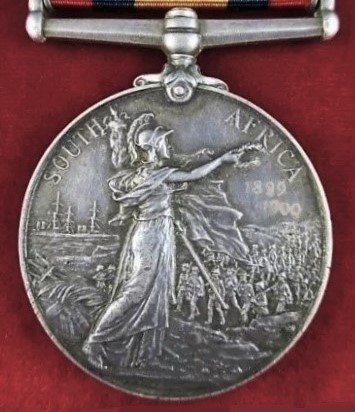
Version 2, showing 'ghost' dates

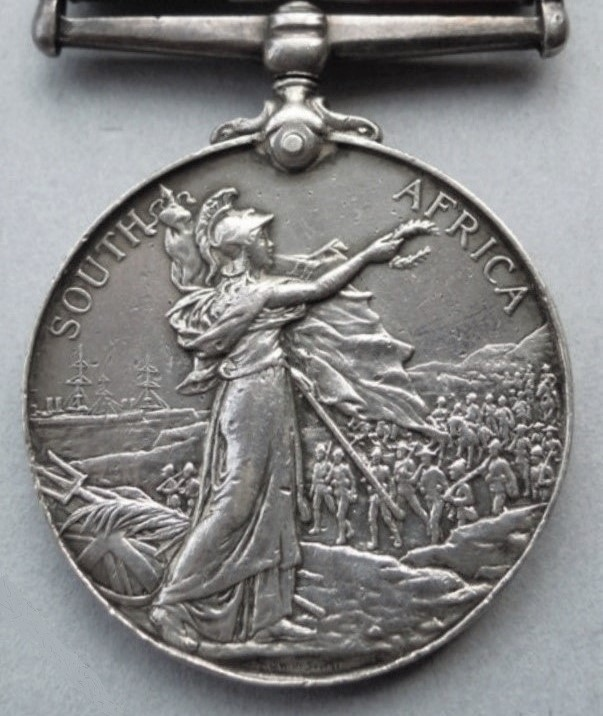
Version 3, a new die, with AFRICA in lower position

Clasps

The clasps were attached to the suspender and to each other in roller chain fashion with rivets. Clasps were often issued after the medal, in particular those for South Africa 1901 and 1902, with the result that they were sometimes attached with unofficial rivets, or worn loose on the ribbon.

Naming

The recipient's name and details were impressed on the rim of the medal, with some officer's medals engraved.

About 1,500 medals were presented unnamed to members of Australian and New Zealand forces during the 1901 tour of those countries by the future King George V. Many were later named locally, either officially at public expense, or privately.

Ribbon

The ribbon is 32 millimetres wide, with a 7 millimetres wide red band and a 4 millimetres wide dark blue band, repeated in reverse order and separated by a 10 millimetres wide orange band.

== Order of wear ==
Campaign medals and stars are not listed by name in the order of wear prescribed by the British Central Chancery of the Orders of Knighthood, but are all grouped together as taking precedence after the Queen's Medal for Chiefs and before the Polar Medals, in order of the date of the campaign for which awarded.

In the order of wear of British campaign medals, the Queen's South Africa Medal takes precedence after the East and Central Africa Medal and before the Queen's Mediterranean Medal.

The British order of precedence of the Second Boer War campaign medals is as follows:

- The Queen's South Africa Medal.
- The Queen's Mediterranean Medal.
- The Transport Medal.
- The King's South Africa Medal.

=== South Africa ===
Even though the Republican awards for the Second Boer War, the Dekoratie voor Trouwe Dienst and the two campaign awards, the Medalje voor de Anglo-Boere Oorlog and the Lint voor Verwonding, were instituted on behalf of King George V by His Royal Highness, the Governor General of the Union of South Africa, the Dekoratie voor Trouwe Dienst is not listed in the British order of wear and the two campaign awards would therefore most likely also have been excluded.

The South African order of precedence of the Second Boer War campaign medals, in order of the date of the campaign for which awarded, is as follows:

- The Queen's South Africa Medal.
- The Medalje voor de Anglo-Boere Oorlog.
- The Lint voor Verwonding.
- The King's South Africa Medal.

On 6 April 1952 the Union of South Africa instituted its own range of military decorations and medals. These new awards were worn before all earlier British decorations and medals awarded to South Africans, with the exception of the Victoria Cross, which still took precedence before all other awards. Of the official British campaign medals which were applicable to South Africans, the Queen's South Africa Medal took precedence as shown.

- Preceded by the Cape of Good Hope General Service Medal.
- Succeeded by the Medalje voor de Anglo-Boere Oorlog.

== See also ==
- King's South Africa Medal
- Cape Copper Company Medal for the Defence of O'okiep
- Kimberley Star
