= Namaqualand 0-4-2ST Pioneer =

Type of steam locomotive

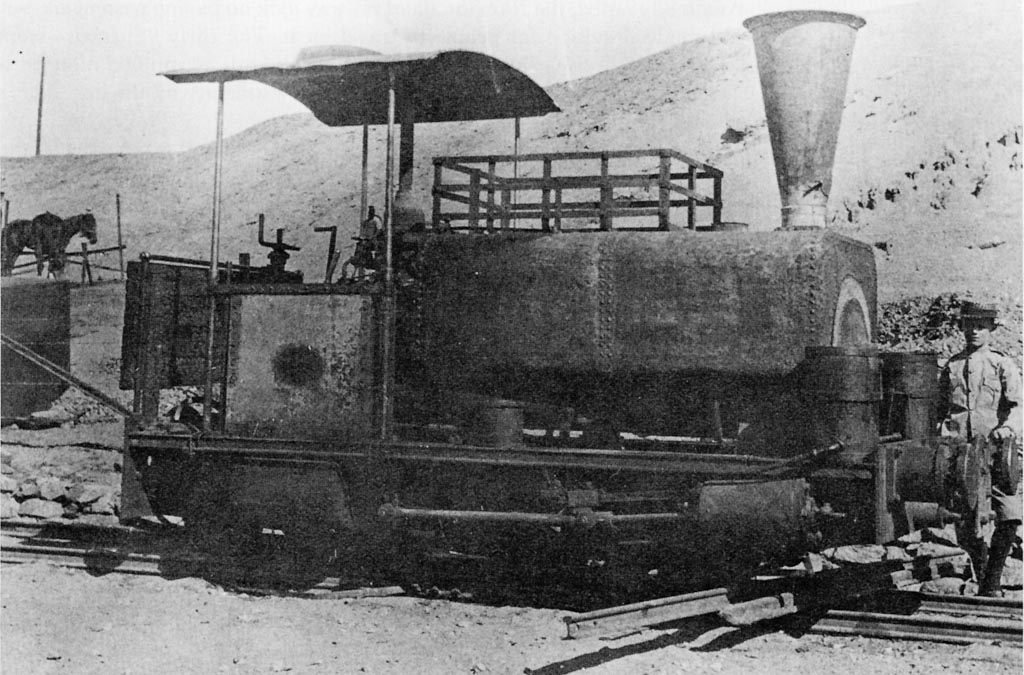
- Namaqua Copper Company 0-4-2ST Pioneer, c. 1905
Type and origin
- Power type: Steam
- Designer: Dick, Kerr & Company
- Builder: Dick, Kerr & Company
- Build date: 1901
- Rebuilder: Dick, Kerr & Company; Namaqua Copper Company
- Rebuild date: 1901
- Number rebuilt: 1 from 0-4-0ST wood-burning to 0-4-2ST oil-burning
Specifications
- Configuration
  - Whyte: 0-4-2ST
  - UIC: B1n2t
- Driver: 2nd coupled axle
- Gauge: 2 ft 6 in (762 mm) Namaqualand
- Loco weight: 7 LT (7,112 kg)
- Fuel type: Oil
- Firebox
  - Type: Round-top
- Cylinders: Two
- Couplers: Buffers-and-chain
Career
- Operators: Namaqua Copper Company
- Number in class: 1
- Official name: Pioneer
- Delivered: 1901
- First run: 1901

The Namaqua Copper Company 0-4-2ST Pioneer of 1901 was a South African steam locomotive from the pre-Union era in the Cape of Good Hope.

In 1901, the Namaqua Copper Company acquired its first locomotive, a 0-4-2ST shunting engine named Pioneer, for use on its tramway line between its main mine at Tweefontein and Flat Mine at Concordia.

== Namaqua Copper Company ==
The Namaqua United Copper Company was formed to take over the Namaqua Copper Company from 1 January 1888 and, on 14 May 1888, it was reconstructed as the Namaqua Copper Company. In 1889, the mine built a 7 1/2-mile-long (12.1-kilometre) branch line from Braakpits Junction, near O'okiep, to Flat Mine where the company's ore crusher was located. The line was opened to traffic on 23 April 1889. Braakpits Junction was on the Namaqualand Railway of the Cape Copper Company, which ran from Port Nolloth on the West Coast to the copper mines around O'okiep.

A tramway line was also constructed from Flat Mine to the company's most important mine at Tweefontein, as well as branch lines to the Company stores at Concordia and the copper floor at Flat Mine. At the Port Nolloth end of the Namaqualand Railway, a short line was also built to serve the Company store at Port Nolloth. Trains were mule-hauled from the beginning.

Copper ore from the Namaqua Copper Company's mines and other Company traffic made use of the Cape Copper Company line between Braakpits Junction and Porth Nolloth. Until the Namaqua Copper Company acquired its own 8 ton capacity mainline trucks, goods and ore had to be transshipped at Braakpits Junction. By 1906, the company had a fleet of thirty trucks.

The Company survived the post-First World War depression in spite of a prolonged stoppage of mining from May 1918, but towards the end of the 1920s its copper reserves were running out and the collapse in the copper price led to final closure in July 1931. The assets of the Namaqua Copper Company were sold in 1932 and 1933 and the properties were taken over by the O'okiep Copper Company in 1939.

== The locomotive Pioneer ==
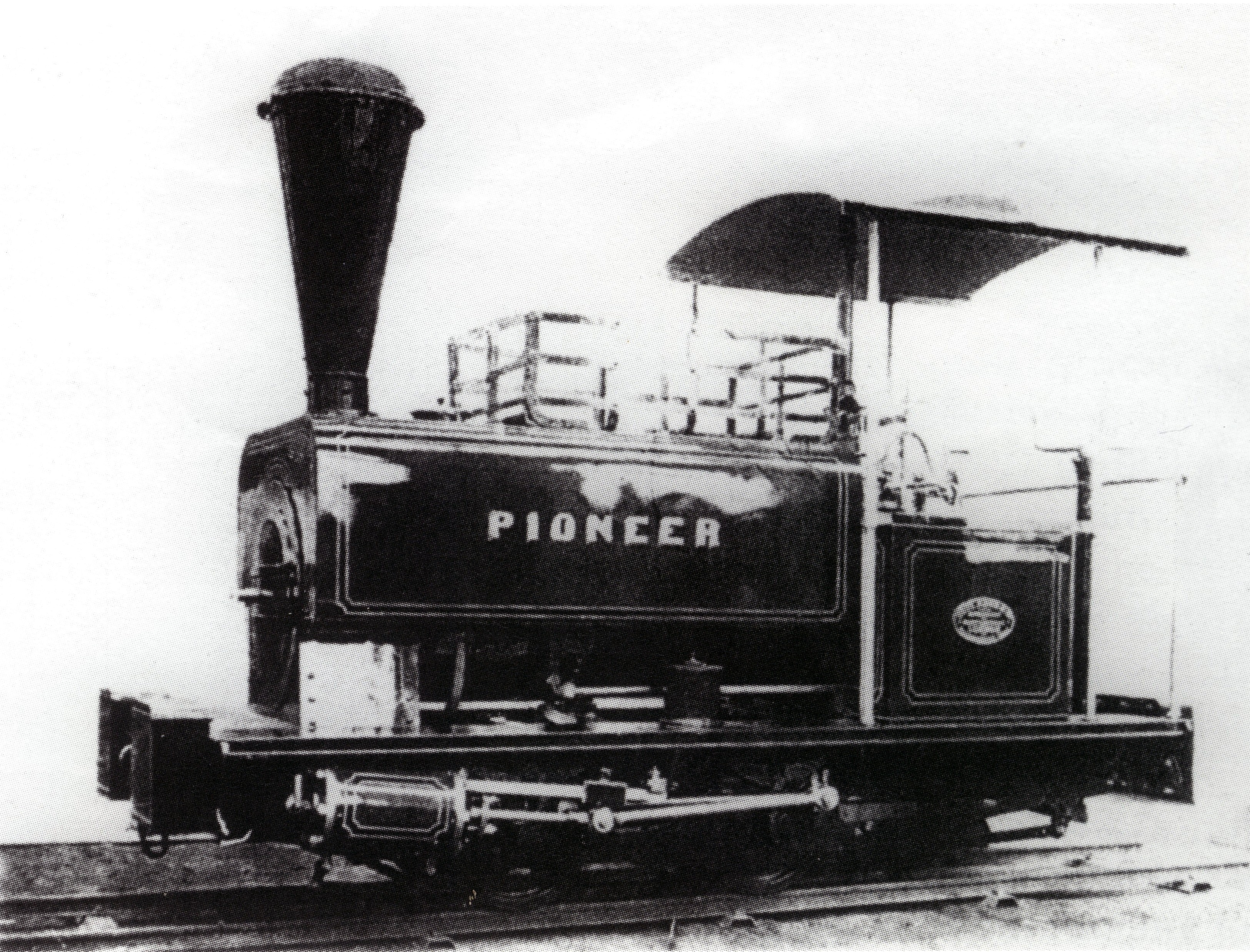
Pioneer, as built in 0-4-0ST configuration, c. 1901

The Namaqua Copper Company acquired its first steam locomotive from Dick, Kerr & Company in 1901. It was named Pioneer and was constructed as a wood-burning 0-4-0ST locomotive with a balloon chimney which contained a spark arrester. The locomotive had a fuel rack mounted on top of the tank, ahead of the cab.

In service, photographs show the locomotive as a 0-4-2ST oil-burning engine with the spark arrester removed from the chimney, with oil tanks mounted underneath the running boards below the cab and with a trailing axle added below the cab to carry the additional weight of the tanks at the rear end. Whether these modifications were carried out pre-delivery by Dick, Kerr or post-delivery by the mining company is not known.

In all, the Namaqua Copper Company had five locomotives by 1907, the 7-ton engine Pioneer being the first and the smallest. A 9-ton locomotive named Volunteer (or Engineer) followed in 1902. Three 12-ton locomotives named Muleteer, Buccaneer (Nuccaneer according to one source) and Reindeer were delivered in 1903, May 1905 and February 1907 respectively. These locomotives replaced the mules on the Namaqua Copper Company mainline to Braakpits Junction.

== Service ==
The locomotive Pioneer was too light for work on the company's mainline to Braakpits Junction and was placed in service on the tramway to Tweefontein. It gained its place in history during the Second Boer War, when it was commandeered by Boer forces.

Towards the end of the Second Boer War, the Cape of Good Hope was invaded by Boer commandos and, on 4 April 1902, the town Concordia surrendered to Boer forces. From 8 April to 3 May, the neighbouring town O'okiep was besieged by the Boer forces under General J.C. Smuts, whose strategy was to capture the rich copper fields and thus force the British to send troops from Cape Town to O'okiep, which would leave Cape Town vulnerable to attack.

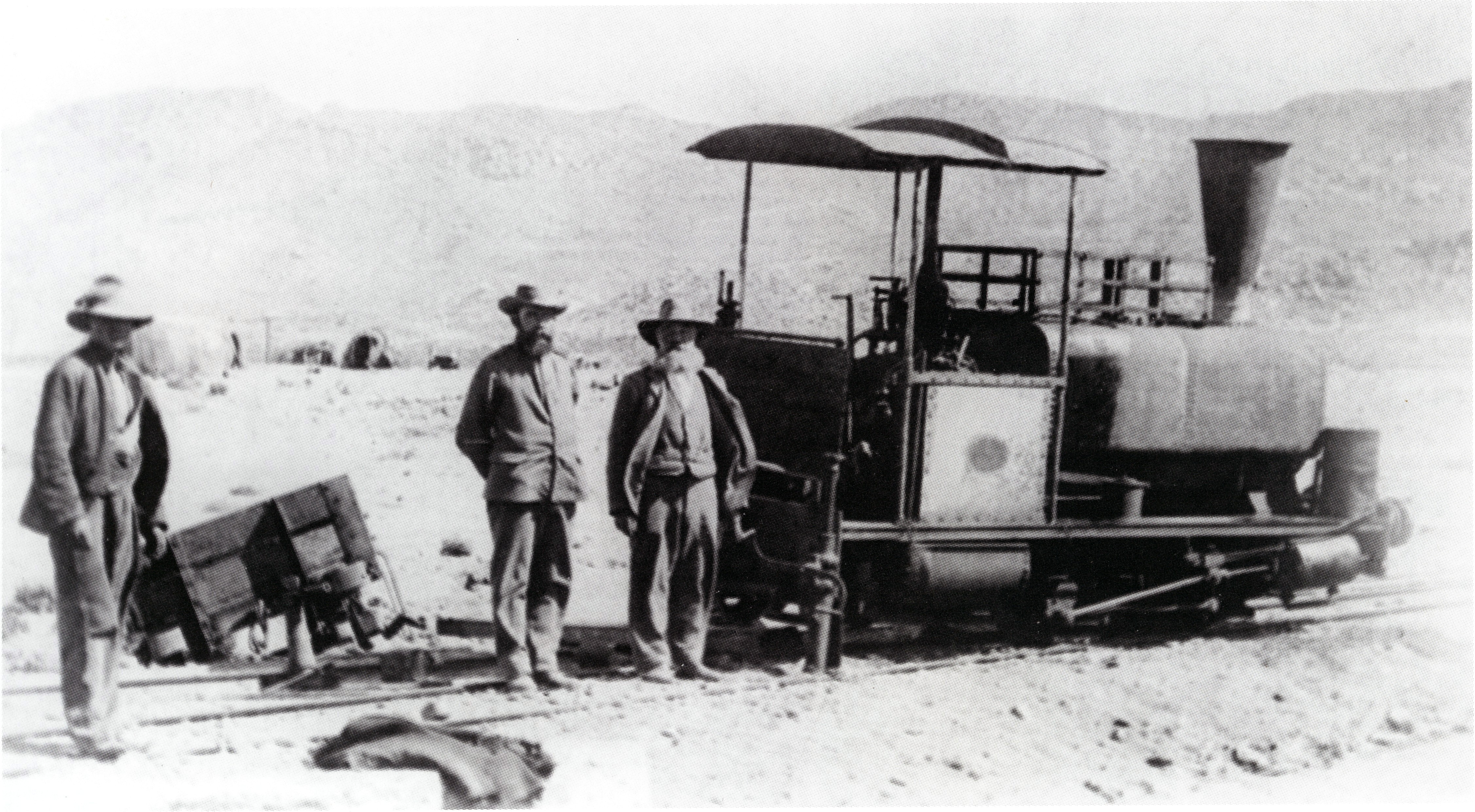
Pioneer derailed outside O'okiep after the Boer commando attack on the town

The garrison of O'okiep consisted of some 900 men, mostly employees of the Cape Copper Company, three-quarters of whom were coloured. A chain of blockhouses and other defensive positions had been prepared and early in the siege, the garrison succeeded in repulsing several determined attacks by the commando. However, when the departure of Smuts with a British safe-conduct to the deliberations at Vereeniging heralded the end of the war, the siege became little more than a good-humoured blockade.

On 1 May 1902, the commandos launched an attack on O'okiep, using the commandeered locomotive Pioneer to propel a mobile bomb in the form of a truck-load of dynamite into the besieged town. The protective defences at O'okiep consisted of a barbed wire fence which was erected across the railway line at Braakpits Junction, just north of the town. The points at the junction were rigged to the fence, with the result that, when the dynamite-laden truck breached the fence, it derailed at the points and spilled its load of dynamite on the ground, where it burned out harmlessly without exploding.

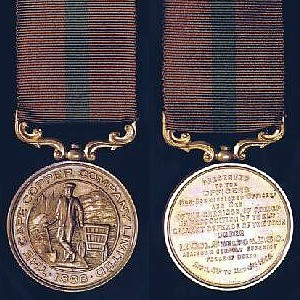
Cape Copper Company Medal for the Defence of O'okiep

According to Smuts, the railway between the two towns was still intact, but since there were women and children in O'okiep town, all the commando was allowed to do was to give O'okiep a tremendous fright with a harmless explosion. Boer General Ben Bouwer had inspected the trainload before it was sent hurtling into the besieged town, to make sure that there were no caps in the dynamite.

The Second Boer War ended with the signing of the Treaty of Vereeniging in Pretoria on 31 May 1902. When it later transpired that the coloured members of the O'okiep garrison were excluded from receiving the Queen's South Africa Medal, the Cape Copper Company struck a medal of its own and presented it to all the defenders, regardless of race. The obverse of the Cape Copper Company Medal for the Defence of O'okiep depicts a miner with a spade, standing next to an ore truck.

The locomotive Pioneer was eventually retrieved from O'okiep on 29 July 1902, repaired and placed back in service. By 1906, the locomotive was described as being "past much work" and was only occasionally used for light work.
