= SADF (disambiguation) =

SADF may refer to:

- South African Defence Force, former military of South Africa
- SADF Champion Shot Medal, military medal
- SADF, the ICAO code for San Fernando Airport (Argentina)
