= Commandant General's Medal =

- Type: Military marksmanship medal
- Awarded for: Champion shot of the annual SADF Shooting Championships
- Country: South Africa
- Presented by: the Commandant General and, from 1965, the State President
- Eligibility: All Ranks
- Status: Discontinued in 1975
- Established: 1965
- First award: 1962
- Final award: 1975

Highlights
- Total: 14
- Ribbon bar

SADF pre-1994 & SANDF post-2002 orders of wear
- Next (higher): SADF precedence: Queen's Medal for Champion Shots in the Military Forces; SANDF precedence: Queen's Medal for Champion Shots in the Military Forces
- Next (lower): SADF succession: SADF Champion Shot Medal; SANDF succession: SADF Champion Shot Medal

The Commandant General's Medal is a military marksmanship medal which was created by the Commandant General of the South African Defence Force in 1962 and formally instituted by the State President in 1965. It was awarded to the champion shot of the annual South African Defence Force Shooting Championships from 1962 to 1975. The year the award was earned, is shown on a bar which is worn on the ribbon. The award could be won multiple times, with each subsequent award indicated by an additional bar.

== The South African military ==
The Union Defence Forces (UDF) were established in 1912 and renamed the South African Defence Force (SADF) in 1958. On 27 April 1994, it was integrated with six other independent forces into the South African National Defence Force (SANDF).

== Institution ==
The Commandant General's Medal replaced the Queen's Medal for Champion Shots in the Military Forces of the United Kingdom, which stopped being awarded to South Africans after the country became a Republic on 31 May 1961. Even though the new medal was officially sanctioned from 1962 to 1965, the Commandant General was not an official Fount of Honour.

The medal was only formally instituted by the State President by Warrant dated 20 January 1965, published in Government Gazette no. 1018 dated 5 February 1965. The regulations, contained in Government Notice 183, were published in Government Gazette no. 1024 dated 12 February 1965.

== Award criteria ==
From 1962, the medal was awarded to the overall champion shot of the annual South African Defence Force Shooting Championships. The year the award was earned, is shown on a bar which is worn on the ribbon. The award could be won multiple times and each subsequent award to the same champion was indicated by an additional bar.

== Order of wear ==
The position of the Commandant General's Medal in the official order of precedence was revised three times after 1975, to accommodate the inclusion or institution of new decorations and medals, first upon the integration into the South African National Defence Force on 27 April 1994, again in April 1996, when decorations and medals were belatedly instituted for the two former non-statutory forces, the Azanian People's Liberation Army and Umkhonto we Sizwe, and again upon the institution of a new set of awards on 27 April 2003, but it remained unchanged on all three occasions.

Official SADF order of precedence

- Preceded by the Queen's Medal for Champion Shots in the Military Forces of the United Kingdom.
- Succeeded by the SADF Champion Shot Medal.

Official national order of precedence

- Preceded by the Queen's Medal for Champion Shots in the Military Forces of the United Kingdom.
- Succeeded by the SADF Champion Shot Medal.

The Queen's Medal for Champion Shots in the Military Forces was omitted in error from the official order of precedence, as published in Government Gazette no. 15093 on 3 September 1993, but included again in Government Gazette no. 27376 on 11 March 2005.

== Description ==
Obverse

The Commandant General's Medal is a medallion struck in silver, 3 millimetres thick at the centre and 38 millimetres in diameter, depicting the five-pointed outline of the Castle of Good Hope, with a laurel between the two points at the bottom and proteas between the others. A roundel in the centre has two crossed rifles over a shooting target, with a shooting range in the background. It is inscribed "KOMMANDANT-GENERAALS-MEDALJE" and "COMMANDANT GENERAL'S MEDAL" below the target, each language in two lines. The suspender is decorated with protea leaves.

Reverse

The reverse has the pre-1994 South African Coat of Arms and the medal number is impressed at the bottom of the medal on the rim.

Ribbon

The ribbon is 32 millimetres wide, with a 6 millimetres wide light blue band and a 7 millimetres wide dark orange band, repeated in reverse order and separated by a 6 millimetres wide navy blue band in the centre. Dark orange, light blue and navy blue are the colours of the three Arms of the Service, the South African Army, the South African Air Force and the South African Navy.

Bar

The bar is of silver and displays the year the award was won on a circular button in the centre. When ribbons alone are worn, separate circular buttons, displaying the respective years, are worn on the ribbon bar to denote each subsequent award of the medal.

== Discontinuation ==
The Commandant General's Medal was discontinued in 1975 and replaced by the SADF Champion Shot Medal, which was instituted by the State President on 1 October 1975.

== Recipients ==
The champions from 1962 to 1975 are listed in the table.

Year	Rank	Initials	Surname	Service Arm
1962	S Sgt	D.J.	Terblanche	SA Army
1963	Rfn	L.J.D.	Clarke	SA Army
1964	Rfn	A.D.	Swart	SA Army
1965	WO2	W.S.	van Vuuren	SAAF
1966	CO	J.J.	Kasselman	
1967	S Sgt	D.J.	Terblanche	SA Army
1968	Capt	J.H.	Grobler	
1969	Lt	J.J.	Kasselman	
1970	WO1	C.H.	du Plooy	
1971	WO1	C.H.	du Plooy	
1972	Capt	C.E.	Schulenberg	
1973	Capt	A.L.	van Graan	SA Army
1974	Rfn	I.	Bekker	SA Army
1975	Capt	C.J.	de Beer	
