= Sir Harry Smith's Medal for Gallantry =

- Type: Military decoration for bravery
- Awarded for: Gallantry in action
- Country: Cape of Good Hope
- Presented by: Major General Sir Henry George Wakelyn Smith, Bt GCB
- Eligibility: All ranks
- Campaign: 8th Cape Frontier War
- Status: Unofficial
- Established: 1851
- First award: 1851

Highlights
- Total: 31
- Ribbon bar

In the Colonies and former Boer Republics which became the Union of South Africa in 1910, several unofficial military decorations and medals were instituted and awarded during the nineteenth and early twentieth century. Sir Harry Smith's Medal for Gallantry is an unofficial military decoration for bravery, awarded for actions following the siege of Fort Cox in December 1850, at the beginning of the 8th Cape Frontier War. The medal was privately instituted in 1851 by Major General Sir Henry George Wakelyn Smith Bt GCB, at the time the Governor and Commander-in-Chief of the Cape of Good Hope.

== The 8th Cape Frontier War ==
Fort Cox was situated inland from King William's Town. During the unrest in the Eastern Cape in December 1850, which led to the outbreak of the 8th Cape Frontier War, the longest, costliest and bloodiest of the frontier wars, Cape of Good Hope Governor Sir Harry Smith travelled to the Fort to meet with prominent Xhosa chiefs. Smith's reputation for humiliating treatment of the various chiefs had already fostered a deep, smouldering anger amongst the Xhosa peoples, even though he still believed that they regarded him as their Inkhosi Inkhulu or Supreme Chief.

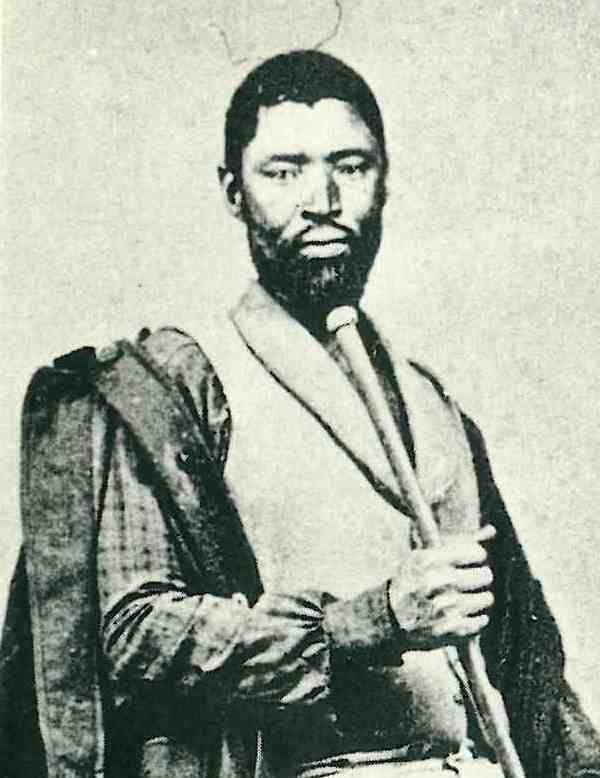
Sandile kaNgqika

One of the chiefs, Sandile kaNgqika, King of the Rharhabe clan, refused to attend the meeting outside the fort on 19 December and was therefore declared as deposed and a fugitive by Smith, who ordered the gathering of some 3,000 Ngqika and their chiefs to capture Sandile and his rebels to demonstrate their own loyalty to the Crown and avoid the fate of those who defied it. This was the last straw and Fort Cox then came under siege from warriors of the Xhosa tribes, led by Chief Sandile.

Fort Cox was not provisioned to withstand a long siege, had no artillery and could only be supplied with water by hazardous expeditions to and from the Keiskamma River far below. Several attempts to relieve the Fort were unsuccessful and Smith, concerned that his being trapped in Fort Cox would affect the Colony's morale and cause the defection of loyal Xhosa tribes, decided to fight his way out. On 31 December 1850, escorted by about 250 men of the Cape Mounted Riflemen, which consisted of Khoisan and Coloured men under white officers, Smith succeeded to get through the Xhosa lines and safely reached King William's Town, after evading an attempt to stop him at Debe Nek. Fort Cox was finally relieved on 31 January 1851.

== Institution ==
Impressed by the showing of the Cape Mounted Riflemen under his command, Smith created Sir Harry Smith's Medal for Gallantry in recognition of their conduct. In later years, when asked who made the best soldiers, Smith put the men of southern France during the Battle of Waterloo in a class of their own, followed by the Cape's Hottentots who had, in his opinion, a truly remarkable natural aptitude for soldiering.

Although the British government initially disapproved of Sir Harry's institution of the medal, it subsequently paid for it and thereby gave it recognition, but not official status. Sir Harry Smith's Medal for Gallantry is regarded by some as the first South African military medal. As an unofficial British medal for valour, it predates the institution of the Victoria Cross (1856) as well as the oldest British award for gallantry, the Distinguished Conduct Medal (1854).

== Description ==
The medal is a disk, 34 millimetres in diameter and struck in silver. The plain curved bar suspender is attached to the medal through a hole in the top of a claw mount, which is attached to the medal by a pin through the upper edge of the medal.

Obverse

The obverse depicts a lion beneath a crown of laurel leaves, with the year "1851" in the exergue.

Reverse

The reverse is plain and is inscribed "PRESENTED BY" around the upper perimeter, "HIS EXCELLENCY", "SIR H.G. SMITH BART C.G.B." and "TO" in three lines in the centre, with open space for private naming, and "FOR GALLANTRY IN THE FIELD" around the bottom perimeter.

Ribbon

The ribbon is 32 millimetres wide with 7 millimetres wide brownish red bands, separated by an 18 millimetres wide dark blue band. While the ribbon has been described as being that of the British Sutlej Medal, the dimensions and colour of the bands appear to be different.

== Recipients ==
Around 31 of the medals were awarded to officers and men of the Cape Mounted Riflemen for gallantry in action. Of these, 23 are known and 20 are known to have been privately engraved in various styles with the names of the recipients.

The medals known or reputed to have been named are:

- Paul Arendt (depicted).
- Piet Jan Cornelis.
- RSM William Richard Dakins.
- Thomas Dicks.
- Thomas Duncan.
- Sapper R. Dunning, RE.
- Henry Evans.
- David Faroe.
- Hendrick Ferara.
- Fundi.
- J. Hassall.
- John Keiburg.
- Lt. Edward Lister-Green.
- John Main.
- H. McKain.
- John McVarrie.
- Francis Meades, CMR.
- J. Mouatt, CMR.
- Capt. Skead, RN.
- Adrian Strauss.

The unnamed medals known or reputed to have been issued are:

- Sgt. Lodewyck Kleinhans.
- Sgt. Appolis Lieuw.
- Sgt. Maj. Johannes Tass.

== Status ==
While privately instituted military decorations and medals do not enjoy official status as a result of not having been formally instituted or sanctioned by the fount of honour at the time, and while none of them were therefore allowed to be worn with military uniform, some have become well-known and have acquired recognition in South Africa's military medal history. Four of these decorations and medals are considered to be significant.

- Sir Harry Smith's Medal for Gallantry of 1851.
- The Johannesburg Vrijwilliger Corps Medal of 1899.
- The Kimberley Star of 1900.
- The Cape Copper Company Medal for the Defence of O'okiep of 1902.

== See also ==
- Harrismith
- Ladismith
- Ladysmith
