= Johannesburg Vrijwilliger Corps Medal =

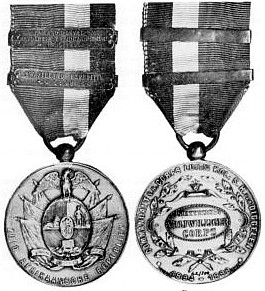
- Type: Campaign medal
- Awarded for: Voluntary military service
- Country: Zuid Afrikaansche Republiek
- Presented by: Lieutenant Colonel S.H. van Diggelen
- Eligibility: All ranks
- Campaigns: Jameson Raid; Swaziland Expedition
- Clasps: JAMESON INVAL EN REVOLUTIE TE JOHANNESBURG 1895–1896; SWAZIELAND EXPEDITIE 1898
- Status: Unofficial
- Established: 1899
- First award: 1899
- Ribbon bar

In the Colonies and Boer Republics which became the Union of South Africa in 1910, several unofficial military decorations and medals were instituted and awarded during the nineteenth and early twentieth century. The Johannesburg Vrijwilliger Corps Medal is an unofficial private campaign medal which was instituted in 1899 by Lieutenant Colonel S.H. van Diggelen, the founder and Commanding Officer of the Johannesburg Vrijwilliger Corps, for award to the officers and men of his unit.

== The Volunteer Corps ==
In terms of Act 17, 1894, three Volunteer Corps units were established in the Zuid Afrikaansche Republiek in 1894, in Pretoria, Johannesburg and Krugersdorp.

The Johannesburg Vrijwilliger Corps was founded and largely financed by Mr. S.H. van Diggelen, who was commissioned by President Paul Kruger as its commander with the rank of lieutenant colonel. The first meeting to form the Corps was held in Van Diggelen's office on 18 September 1894, with subsequent meetings on 19 September 1894 and 27 March 1895. The first meeting in 1894, as the date on the medal suggests, could be considered the day on which the Johannesburg Vrijwilliger Corps was established. The official date of disbandment appears to be 1 January 1899.

== Actions ==
The Johannesburg Vrijwilliger Corps took part in two significant actions. The first was at Doornkop from 29 December 1895 to 2 January 1896, to suppress the planned Johannesburg Uitlander Revolution and against the Jameson Raid, an unsuccessful British-backed attempt to overthrow the Zuid Afrikaansche Republiek government.

The second was the Swaziland Expedition in 1898. The Expedition took place following the murder of the Chief Induna Mbaba at Zomboti, the seat of the Swazis, in April 1898. At the time of the murder, Swaziland was administered by the Republican Government and the expedition seems to have consisted mainly of patrols for the maintenance of order in that country.

Between these two actions, Van Diggelen had also offered his unit's services to the British South Africa Company Administrator in Salisbury during the Second Matabele War in Matabeleland in April 1896, but his offer was declined with thanks.

== Institution ==
The Johannesburg Vrijwilliger Corps Medal was instituted in 1899 by Lieutenant Colonel Van Diggelen to award to the officers and men of the Corps. Whilst the medal does bear the coat of arms of the Zuid Afrikaansche Republiek, which may indicate official sanction, it appears that Van Diggelen arranged and paid for the award himself.

The medals were awarded after the conclusion of the Swaziland Expedition. Two clasps were also awarded, the Jameson Inval en Revolutie te Johannesburg 1895–1896 clasp and the Swazieland Expeditie 1898 clasp. It is not known how many of these medals were awarded, but only ten are known to still exist.

== Description ==
The medal is a disk, 47 millimetres in diameter and struck in bronze. Without suspender, it weighs 48.42 grams. A bronze ring suspender, formed from 1.65-millimetre-diameter wire, passes through a hole in a spherical bronze knob, 7 millimetres in diameter and fused to the top of the medal. The medal was minted by Messrs. Begeer of Utrecht in Holland, now known as Naamlooze Vennootschap Atelier voor Edelsmeed- en Penningkunst voorheen Koninklijke Begeer, Voorschoten.

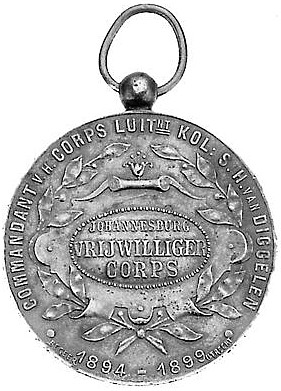
Reverse of the medal

Obverse

The obverse has the coat of arms of the Zuid Afrikaansche Republiek, with the inscription "ZUID AFRIKAANSCHE REPUBLIEK" around the perimeter at the bottom.

Reverse

The reverse has, in the centre, a pearl-rimmed cartouche inscribed "JOHANNESBURG VRIJWILLIGER CORPS" on a decorative background, surrounded by two laurel branches. The upper perimeter is inscribed "COMMANDANT V.H. CORPS LUIT^{NT} KOL: S. H. VAN DIGGELEN", and at the bottom the years "1894-1899". The manufacturer's name is inscribed in small capitals next to the years, "BEGEER" to the left of the year 1894 and "UTRECHT" to the right of the year 1899.

Clasps

The two clasps were struck in bronze and are the width of the ribbon, made to slip over the ribbon. The first is inscribed "JAMESON INVAL EN REVOLUTIE TE JOHANNESBURG 1895-1896" in three lines and is 8.3 millimetres high. The second is inscribed "SWAZIELAND EXPEDITIE 1898" in two lines and is 7 millimetres high.

Ribbon

The ribbon is 1 1/2 inches (38 millimetres) wide, with equal width bands of bright grass-green, scarlet, white and deep sky-blue, the colours of the Transvaal Vierkleur.

== Status ==
While privately instituted military decorations and medals do not enjoy official status, as a result of not having been formally instituted or sanctioned by the fount of honour at the time, and while none of them were therefore allowed to be worn with military uniform, some have become well-known and have acquired recognition in South Africa's military medal history. Four of these decorations and medals are considered to be significant.

- Sir Harry Smith's Medal for Gallantry of 1851.
- The Johannesburg Vrijwilliger Corps Medal of 1899.
- The Kimberley Star of 1900.
- The Cape Copper Company Medal for the Defence of O'okiep of 1902.
