= Kimberley Star =

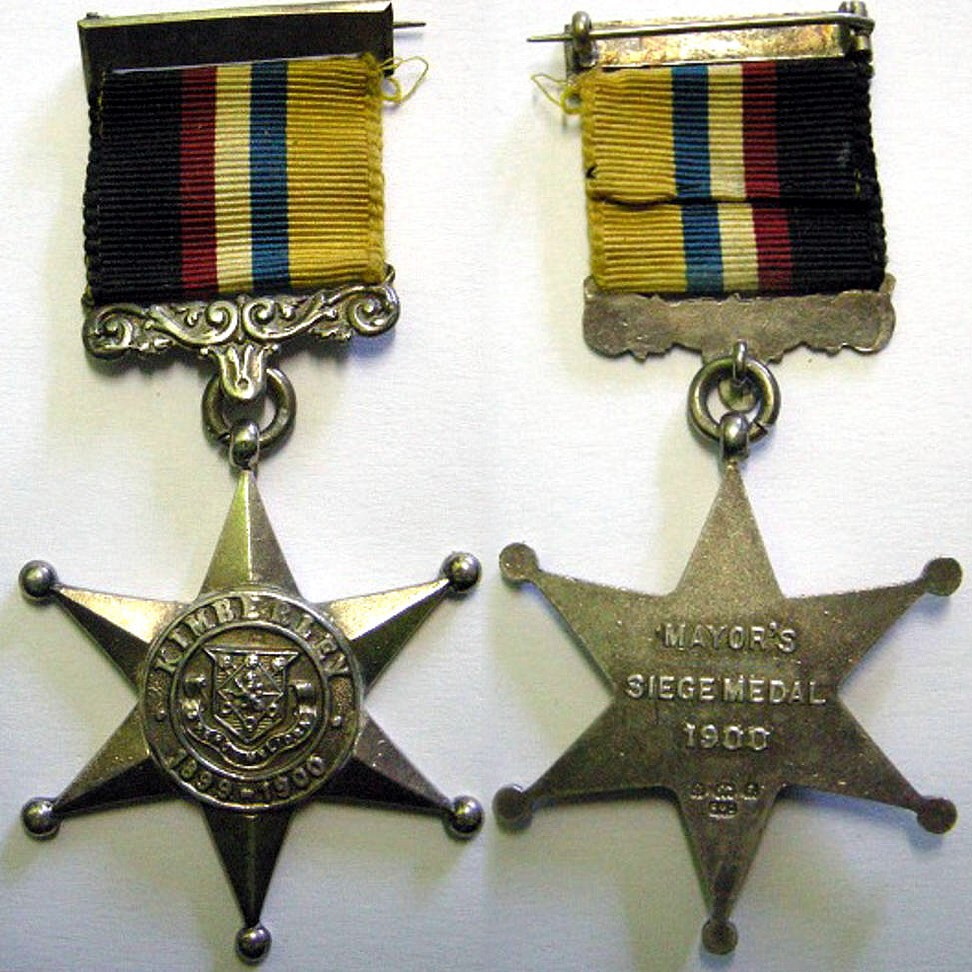
- Type: Campaign medal
- Awarded for: the Siege of Kimberley
- Country: Cape of Good Hope
- Presented by: the Mayor of Kimberley
- Eligibility: Defenders of Kimberley
- Campaign: Second Boer War
- Status: Unofficial
- Established: 1900

Highlights
- Total: 5,000
- Ribbon bar
- Related: Queen's South Africa Medal

In the Colonies and Boer Republics which became the Union of South Africa in 1910, several unofficial military decorations and medals were instituted and awarded during the nineteenth and early twentieth century. The Kimberley Star is an unofficial private campaign medal which was instituted by the Mayor of Kimberley in 1900. The medal was awarded to all who took part in the defence of the diamond mining town during the four months in 1899 and 1900 while Kimberley was besieged by Boer Republican Forces during the Second Boer War.

== The Siege of Kimberley ==
The Second Boer War between the United Kingdom and the allied Boer Republics, the South African Republic and the Orange Free State, broke out on 11 October 1899. In the first phase of the war, the Boer Republican Forces mounted pre-emptive strikes into British-held territories in Natal and the Cape of Good Hope, and besieged the British garrisons at Ladysmith in Natal and at Mafeking and Kimberley in the Cape of Good Hope. The siege of Kimberley began on 14 October 1899 and lasted four months, until the town was relieved on 15 February 1900.

Official military recognition for the defence and relief of Kimberley took the form of two clasps to the Queen's South Africa Medal, the British campaign medal which was awarded to British and Colonial military personnel, civilians employed in official capacity and war correspondents, who served in the Second Boer War.

- "DEFENCE OF KIMBERLEY" - This clasp was awarded to all troops in the garrison of Kimberley between 14 October 1899 and 15 February 1900 inclusive.
- "RELIEF OF KIMBERLEY" - This clasp was awarded to all troops in the relief column under Lieutenant General French who marched from Klipdrift on 15 February 1900, and all the 6th Division troops under Lieutenant General Thomas Kelly-Kenny who were within 7,000 yards of Klipdrift on 15 February 1900.

== Institution ==
In addition to the military honours and to also honour non-military townsfolk who took part in the defence of the town during the siege, Mayor of Kimberley H.A. Oliver instituted the Kimberley Star in 1900. The medal was awarded to all men who were engaged in the defence of Kimberley as well as to members of the British Forces in the Kimberley Garrison. These included, amongst others, the Kimberley Town Guard, the Kimberley Regiment, the De Beers Maxim Battery, the Cape Police, the Loyal North Lancashire Regiment and the Diamond Fields Artillery. Since the medal did not enjoy official status, however, the military recipients were not allowed to wear the medal in uniform.

== Description ==
The Kimberley Star was six-pointed, with a ball on each point and struck in silver, to fit into a 46 millimetres diameter circle. Two Kimberley Stars were struck in gold. The star is attached to the suspender by a ring, which passes through an eyelet formed in the uppermost point-ball of the star. The suspension is in two parts, a decorated bar with an eyelet on the reverse for the suspender ring to pass through and a plain bar at the top of the ribbon with a brooch-pin on the reverse.

Obverse

The obverse has a central design of the Kimberley town shield, surrounded by a circlet inscribed "KIMBERLEY" at the top and "1899-1900" at the bottom.

Reverse

The reverse is plain and is inscribed, in relief, "MAYOR'S SIEGE MEDAL 1900" in three lines, with the silver hallmark impressed at the top of the lowermost star point. The medals were awarded unnamed, although some were unofficially engraved with the name of the recipient.

Ribbon

The ribbon is 25 millimetres (1 inch) wide, with an 8 millimetres wide black band, a 3 millimetres wide red band, a 3 millimetres wide white band, a 3 millimetres wide dark blue band and an 8 millimetres wide yellow band. Various versions of the ribbon exist and, on some, the central white band is wider than the red and blue bands.

== Recipients ==
Approximately 5,000 Kimberley Stars were awarded, but there is no roll of recipients.

== Status ==
While privately instituted military decorations and medals do not enjoy official status as a result of not having been formally instituted or sanctioned by the fount of honour at the time, and while none of them were therefore allowed to be worn with military uniform, some have become well-known and have acquired recognition in South Africa's military medal history. Four of these decorations and medals are considered to be significant.

- Sir Harry Smith's Medal for Gallantry of 1851.
- The Johannesburg Vrijwilliger Corps Medal of 1899.
- The Kimberley Star of 1900.
- The Cape Copper Company Medal for the Defence of O'okiep of 1902.
