= Concordia, South Africa =

Concordia
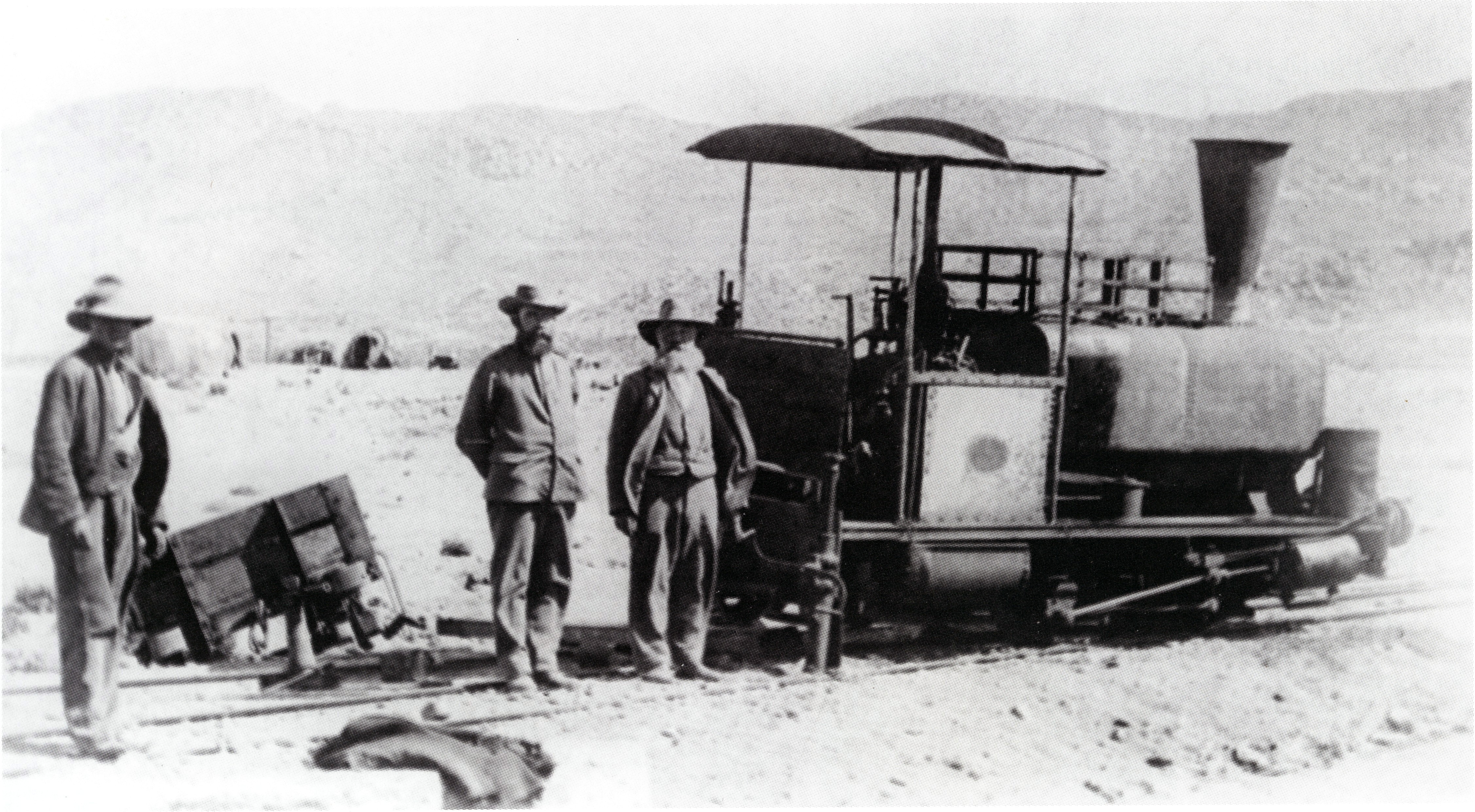
- The locomotive Pioneer derailed outside Okiep after the Boer commando attack on the town, launched from Concordia on 1 May 1902

- Location within Northern Cape Location within South Africa
- Coordinates: 29°32′S 17°57′E
- Country: South Africa
- Province: Northern Cape
- District: Namakwa
- Municipality: Nama Khoi

Area
  - Total: 4.83 km^{2} (1.86 sq mi)

Population (2011)
  - Total: 4,988
  - Density: 1,030/km^{2} (2,670/sq mi)

Racial makeup (2011)
  - Black African: 1.0%
  - Coloured: 97.8%
  - Indian/Asian: 0.6%
  - White: 0.3%
  - Other: 0.4%

First languages (2011)
  - Afrikaans: 98.5%
  - Other: 1.5%
- Time zone: UTC+2 (SAST)
- PO box: 8271

Concordia is a town in Namakwa District Municipality in the Northern Cape province of South Africa. The distance from Concordia to Cape Town is approximately 600 km (370 mi).

Concordia was originally established as a Rhenish mission station in 1852 and copper mining began in 1853 through to 1983 in the area. The town is of historical interest because it is situated at the origin of mining endeavors in South Africa. Long before colonial times (prior to 1652), the indigenous peoples (the Khoisan or Nama) of the area extracted raw or "native copper" from the gneiss and granite hills that make up the surrounding Namaqualand Copper belt. This copper was beaten into decorative items, worn as bangles and neck adornments by these peoples. The copper boom of the late 19th century through to the early nineteen eighties has all but ceased in the area.

There is currently a granite works at Concordia where large blocks of the stone are quarried and cut into large (up to 50 tons) blocks for transport to Cape Town where the granite is exported and used domestically.

During the Anglo Boer War, the Boers used Concordia as their headquarters whilst Okiep (some 6 km away) was under siege.

Today some of the magnificent examples of Cornish stone masonry still exist in addition to the original granary which was used as a hospital by the Boer commandos during the Anglo Boer War.

== Places of interest ==
- The granite ore bins of the Tweefontein Mine has outstanding examples of Cornish stone masonry. The New Prospect Mine houses another granite ore bin in excellent condition.
- The graveyard contains the graves of early Rhenish missionaries and unmarked graves of fallen Boer soldiers.
- Orbicule Hill is a declared heritage site situated just west of Concordia. Exhibiting the finest example of orbicular diorite in the country, the rare rock texture is the result of granitoid magmas separating while in a fluid state which forms concentric internal banding.
- The Rhenish Mission Station was established in 1852 in the same year in which copper was discovered by European prospectors in the area.
- The United Reformed Church is a stone church building erected in 1875 by Cornishmen, with the original organ dating back to 1915. It is a fine example of outstanding stone masonry.

== See also ==
Namaqualand 0-4-2ST Pioneer
