= SADF Champion Shot Medal =

- Type: Military marksmanship medal
- Awarded for: Champion shots of the annual SADF Shooting Championships
- Country: South Africa
- Presented by: the State President and, from 1994, the President
- Eligibility: All Ranks
- Status: Discontinued in 2003
- Established: 1975
- First award: 1975
- Ribbon bar

SADF pre-1994 & SANDF post-2002 orders of wear
- Next (higher): SADF precedence: Commandant General's Medal; SANDF precedence: Commandant General's Medal
- Next (lower): SADF succession: National Cadet Bisley Grand Champion Medal; SANDF succession: National Cadet Bisley Grand Champion Medal

The SADF Champion Shot Medal is a military medal which was instituted by the Republic of South Africa in 1975. It was awarded to the champion shots of the annual South African Defence Force Shooting Championships in the categories of full-bore, small-bore, service shooting and pistol. The medal could be won multiple times, with each subsequent award indicated by a bar.

== Institution ==
The SADF Champion Shot Medal, which replaced the Commandant General's Medal, was instituted by the State President by Warrant dated 1 October 1975, published in Government Gazette no. 4874 dated 17 October 1975.

== Award criteria ==
From 1976, four medals were awarded annually to the champion shots of the South African Defence Force Shooting Championships in the categories of full-bore, small-bore, service shooting and pistol respectively. The medal could be won multiple times and each subsequent award was indicated by the addition of a Bar. Champions who had already been awarded the defunct Commandant General's Medal were awarded Bars to add to their existing medal.

== Order of wear ==
The position of the SADF Champion Shot Medal in the official order of precedence was revised three times after 1975, to accommodate the inclusion or institution of new decorations and medals, first upon the integration into the South African National Defence Force on 27 April 1994, again in April 1996 when decorations and medals were belatedly instituted for the two former non-statutory forces, the Azanian People's Liberation Army and Umkhonto we Sizwe, and again upon the institution of a new set of awards on 27 April 2003, but it remained unchanged on all three occasions.

Official SANDF order of precedence

- Preceded by the Commandant General's Medal of the Republic of South Africa.
- Succeeded by the National Cadet Bisley Grand Champion Medal of the Republic of South Africa.

Official national order of precedence

- Preceded by the Commandant General's Medal of the Republic of South Africa.
- Succeeded by the National Cadet Bisley Grand Champion Medal of the Republic of South Africa.

== Description ==
Obverse

The SADF Champion Shot Medal is a medallion struck in silver, 3 millimetres thick at the centre and 38 millimetres in diameter, depicting the five-pointed outline of the Castle of Good Hope, with a laurel between the two points at the bottom and proteas between the others. A roundel in the centre has two crossed rifles over a shooting target, with a shooting range in the background. It is inscribed "SAW KAMPIOENSKUT-MEDALJE" and "SADF CHAMPION SHOT MEDAL" below the target, each language in two lines. The suspender is decorated with protea leaves.

Reverse

The reverse has the pre-1994 South African Coat of Arms and the medal number is impressed at the bottom of the medal on the rim.

Ribbon

The ribbon is the same as for the Commandant General's Medal, 32 millimetres wide, with a 6 millimetres wide light blue band and a 7 millimetres wide dark orange band, repeated in reverse order and separated by a 6 millimetres wide navy blue band in the centre. Dark orange, light blue and navy blue are the colours of the three Arms of the Service, the South African Army, the South African Air Force and the South African Navy.

Bar

The Bar is of silver and has a shooting target embossed in the centre. When ribbons alone are worn, separate circular buttons are worn on the ribbon bar to denote each subsequent award of the medal.

== Discontinuation ==
Conferment of the medal was discontinued in respect of championships on or after 27 April 2003. No new medal was instituted to replace it.

== Recipients ==
The champions from 1976 to 1986 are listed in the table. An award of a bar to a recipient of the defunct Commandant General's Medal is denoted by "(CGM)" after his surname.

Year	Rank	Initials	Surname	Service Arm
1976	Maj	A.L.	van Graan (CGM)	SA Army
1976	Capt	S.D.	van Niekerk	SA Army
1976	S Sgt	J.A.	van Rhyn	SA Army
1976	Cmdt	D.	Badenhorst	SAAF
1977	Capt	L.A.	Terblanche	SA Army
1977	S Sgt	J.A.	van Rhyn	SA Army
1977	Cpl	J.D.	Berry	SA Army
1977	Cmdt	D.	Badenhorst	SAAF
1978	Maj	C.F.	Schoeman	SA Army
1978	Maj	S.P.	Bezuidenhout	SA Army
1978	Sea	W.	Bosch	SAN
1978	S Lt	G.	de Vries	SAN
1979	Capt	L.A.	Terblanche	SA Army
1979	Col	C.H.	le Roux	SA Army
1979	Cpl	H.F.P.	Rautenbach	SA Army
1979	F Sgt	P.	Weepner	SAAF
1980	Maj	E.M.	Malone	SA Army
1980	2 Lt	G.S.	Potgieter	SA Army
1980	CO	P.	Botha	SA Army
1980	Cpl	J.H.J.	Wessels	SA Army
1981	S Sgt	A.P.	van Niekerk	SA Army
1981	CO	P.	Botha	SA Army
1981	Maj	E.M.	Malone	SA Army
1981	2 Lt	G.S.	Potgieter	SA Army
1983	Brig	A.P.	Moller	SA Army
1983	Pte	L.J.	Driskel	SA Army
1983	Capt	G.S.	Potgieter	SA Army
1983	Cmdt	E.M.	Malone	SA Army
1984	Col	G.A.	van Zyl	SA Army
1984	Cpl	P.J.	Korkle	SA Army
1984	Rfn	B.G.	Enslin	SA Army
1984	WO2	P.	Weepner	SAAF
1985	Capt	G.J.P.	Burger	SAN
1985	Rfn	I.	Cook	SA Army
1985	CO	G.C.O.	Landman	SA Army
1985	WO1	P.	Weepner	SAAF
1986	Pte	M.J.	van Wyk	SA Army
1986	Sgt	F.A.	Woodrup	SAAF
1986	WO2	N.M.B.	van Deventer	SA Army
1986	Col	C.H.	le Roux	SA Army
