= Lint voor Wonden =

South African military campaign award

Lint voor Wonden/Lint voor Verwonding
- The Lint voor Wonden, as worn by Captain C.J. Lourens DTD of the Union Defence Forces, former Assistant Field Cornet and Adjutant of Wakkerstroom Commando during the Anglo-Boer War. The awards depicted are the Dekoratie voor Trouwe Dienst, Medalje voor de Anglo-Boere Oorlog, Lint voor Wonden, 1914-15 Star, British War Medal and Victory Medal, the last two mounted with reverse displayed.
- Type: Riband
- Awarded for: Being wounded on active service
- Country: South Africa
- Presented by: the Monarch of the United Kingdom and the British Dominions, and Emperor of India
- Eligibility: Boer military veterans
- Campaign: 1899–1902 Anglo-Boer War (WIA)
- Clasps: None
- Status: Discontinued in 1946
- Established: 1920
- First award: 1921
- Final award: 1949

Highlights
- Total: 1,060
- SAR and OFS riband bar orientations

South African order of wear
- Next (higher): Medalje voor de Anglo-Boere Oorlog
- Next (lower): King's South Africa Medal

The Lint voor Wonden (Wound Riband, also Lint voor Verwonding) is a South African military campaign award. It was instituted on 21 December 1920 as a retrospective award for Boer veteran officers and men of the 1899–1902 Second Boer War who had been wounded in action.

== Institution ==
The Lint voor Wonden / Lint voor Verwonding, officially designated Lint voor Verwonding Opgedaan Gedurende de Anglo-Boere Oorlog, 1899–1902 (Riband for Wounds Sustained During the Anglo-Boer War, 1899–1902) and referred to as the Lint voor Wonden in some subsequent official documents, was instituted in terms of Government Notice no. 2307 dated 21 December 1920 and published in the Union of South Africa Government Gazette of 24 December 1920. It was a retrospective award for Boer veteran officers and men who were wounded in action while serving in the combat forces of the South African Republic and the Orange Free State during the Second Boer War between 11 October 1899 and 31 May 1902.

Since neither of the two Boer Republics, the South African Republic (Transvaal) and the Orange Free State, had official honours systems of their own, the riband was created to afford Boer veteran officers and men, who were serving as members of the Union Defence Forces, parity with their fellow South Africans who had fought on the British side in the war.

Notices did appear in the Transvaal Government Gazette in May 1900 about the eventual issue of a decoration for bravery for Republican soldiers, but as a result of the eventual British victory, this did not materialise.

The Union Defence Forces (UDF) were established in 1912. In 1913, Colonel Skinner, Commandant of the Military School in Bloemfontein, remarked on the fact that some of the officers attending a course, who had fought valiantly in the Republican Forces, were without medal ribbons whilst their brother officers who had served on the British side were all well decorated. Colonel Skinner made representations to Defence Headquarters to have this omission rectified but, due to the outbreak of the First World War, nothing was done about the matter until 1920, when the Dekoratie voor Trouwe Dienst, the Medalje voor de Anglo-Boere Oorlog and the Lint voor Wonden were instituted.

== Award criteria ==
The Lint voor Wonden was awarded, upon certified application, to veterans who had been wounded on active service while serving in the Republican forces between 11 October 1899 and 31 May 1902. Recipients had to be serving members of the Union Defence Forces, or available to be called up for service in terms of the South Africa Defence Act, 1912.

== Order of wear ==
Campaign medals and stars are not listed by name in the order of wear prescribed by the British Central Chancery of the Orders of Knighthood, but are all grouped together as taking precedence after the Queen's Medal for Chiefs and before the Polar Medals, in order of the date of the campaign for which awarded.

However, even though the Republican awards for the Second Boer War, the Dekoratie voor Trouwe Dienst and the two campaign awards, the Medalje voor de Anglo-Boere Oorlog and the Lint voor Wonden, were instituted on behalf of King George V by His Royal Highness, the Governor General of the Union of South Africa, the Dekoratie voor Trouwe Dienst is not listed in the British order of wear and the two campaign awards would therefore most likely also have been excluded.

=== South Africa ===
In the South African order of wear, the Lint voor Verwonding has the status of a campaign medal and, even though it has no accompanying medal, it takes precedence in wear after the Medalje voor de Anglo-Boere Oorlog and before the King's South Africa Medal. As worn on uniform, the riband was mounted with other decorations and medals on the medal rack, as illustrated in the main picture. On a ribbon bar it was mounted like a regular medal ribbon.

With effect from 6 April 1952, when a new South African set of decorations and medals was instituted to replace the British awards used to date, the older British decorations and medals awarded to South Africans continued to be worn in the same order of precedence but, with the exception of the Victoria Cross, took precedence after all South African decorations and medals awarded to South Africans on or after that date. Amongst the official British campaign medals which were applicable to South Africans, the Lint voor Verwonding takes precedence as shown.

- Preceded by the Medalje voor de Anglo-Boere Oorlog.
- Succeeded by the King's South Africa Medal.

== Description ==
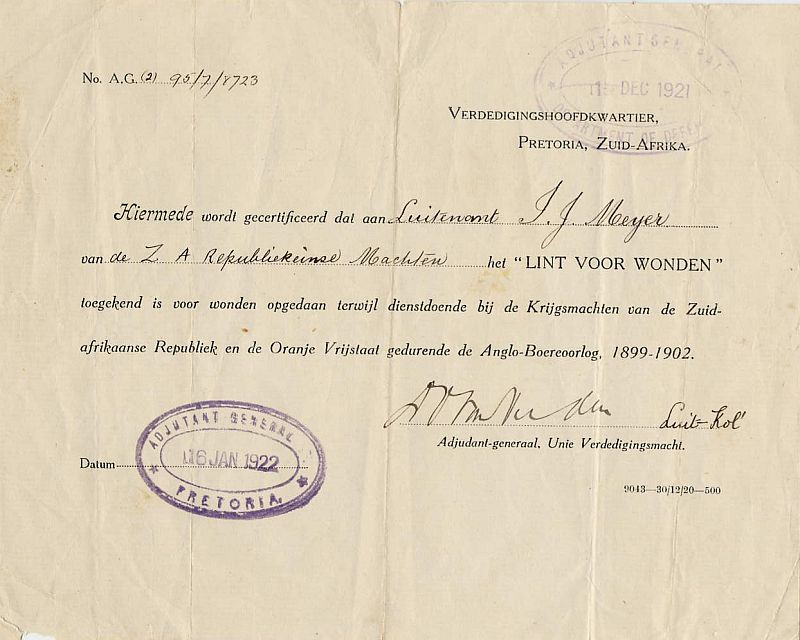
Initial version of the certificate of the Lint voor Wonden, awarded to Luitenant I.J. Meyer of the ZAR forces

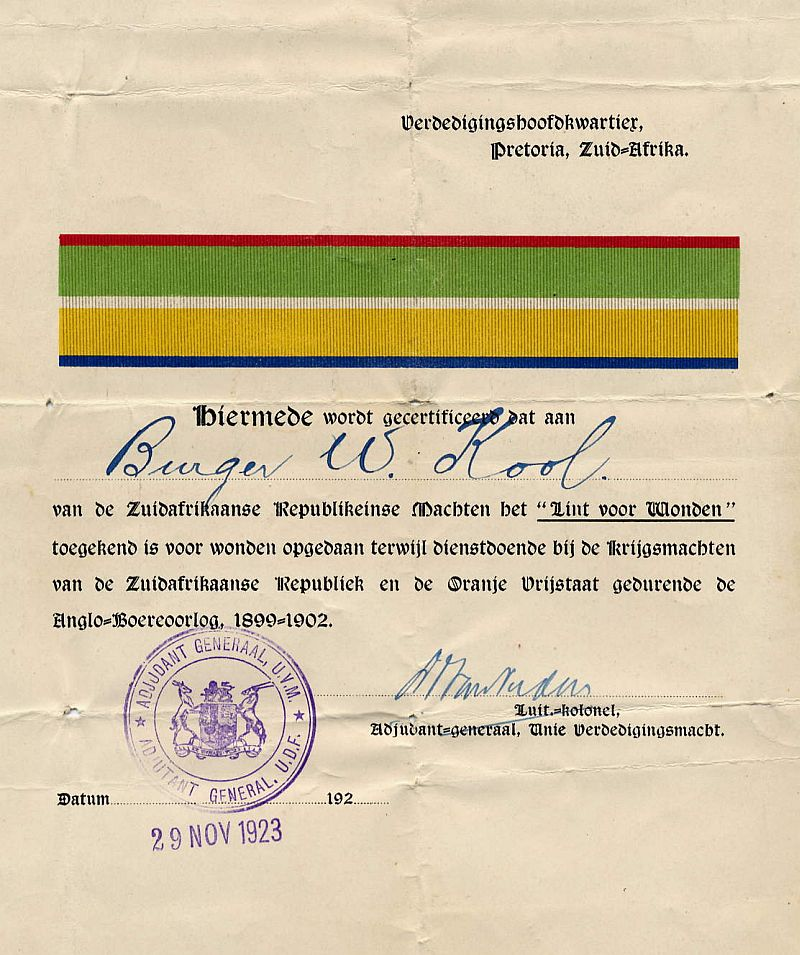
Later version of the certificate of the Lint voor Wonden, awarded to Burger W. Kool of the ZAR forces

The Lint voor Wonden (Lint voor Verwonding) was issued with a printed certificate. The initial version was a plain undecorated certificate, filled out by hand, showing the rank and name of the recipient and the Republican Force with which he had served. It also included the recipient's file number at top left of the document.

The later type of certificate was decorated with a full colour reproduction of the riband. The Republican Force with which the recipient had served was pre-printed on this version, but it did not make provision for the recipient's file number.

The riband is 1 1/2 inches (38 millimetres) wide and in the combined colours of the two former Republics. While these colours were gazetted as red, green, white, blue and orange, the orange appears as yellow on the actual ribbons and was also printed as yellow on the second version of the certificate. As worn by a South African Republic veteran, it has a 3 millimetres wide red band, a 14½ millimetres wide green band, a 4 millimetres wide white band, a 14½ millimetres wide orange band and a 3 millimetres wide blue band. An Orange Free State veteran would wear the riband reversed, with the blue band on the left.

== Discontinuation ==
The original closing date for applications was 30 June 1921, but this was not strictly adhered to. The gazetted regulations, in effect, actually excluded many men who had fought on the Boer side, such as the members of the various foreign units and potentially also the Natal and Cape rebels. In later years, the regulations were less stringently enforced and the eventual qualification for award was proof that the applicant had fought against the British without surrendering or taking either parole or the oath of allegiance prior to 31 May 1902, and had been wounded in action.

Altogether 1,060 Lint voor Wonden Certificates were awarded. As far as could be traced, the last award of the Lint voor Wonden was made on 3 November 1949.
