= Medalje voor de Anglo-Boere Oorlog =

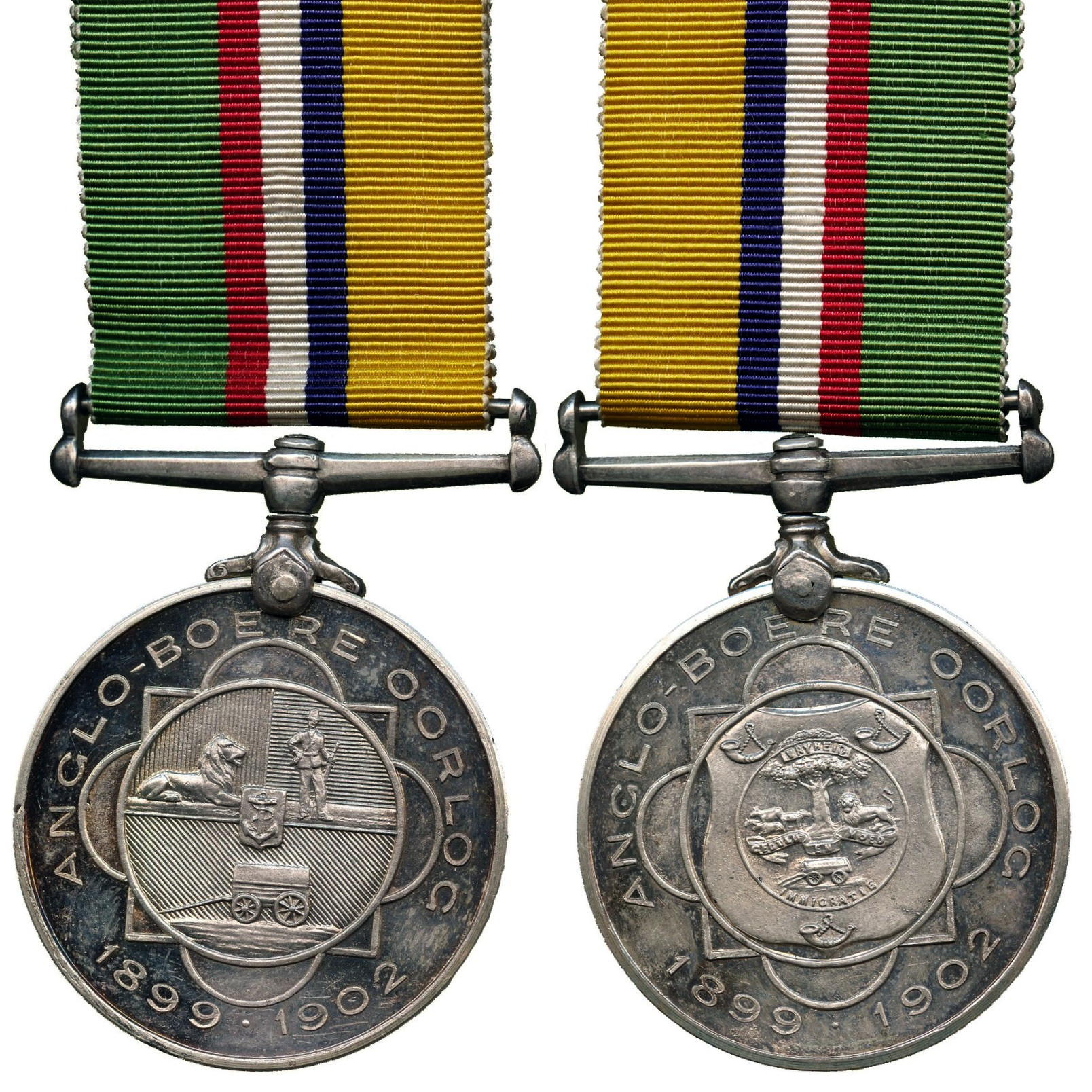
- South African Republic and Orange Free State sides
- Type: Campaign medal
- Awarded for: Campaign service
- Country: South Africa
- Presented by: the Monarch of the United Kingdom and the British Dominions, and Emperor of India
- Eligibility: Boer military veterans
- Campaign: 1899–1902 Anglo Boer War
- Status: Discontinued in 1946
- Established: 1920
- First award: 1921
- Final award: 1982

Highlights
- Total: 13,800
- SAR and OFS ribbon bar orientations

South African order of wear
- Next (higher): Queen's South Africa Medal
- Next (lower): Lint voor Verwonding

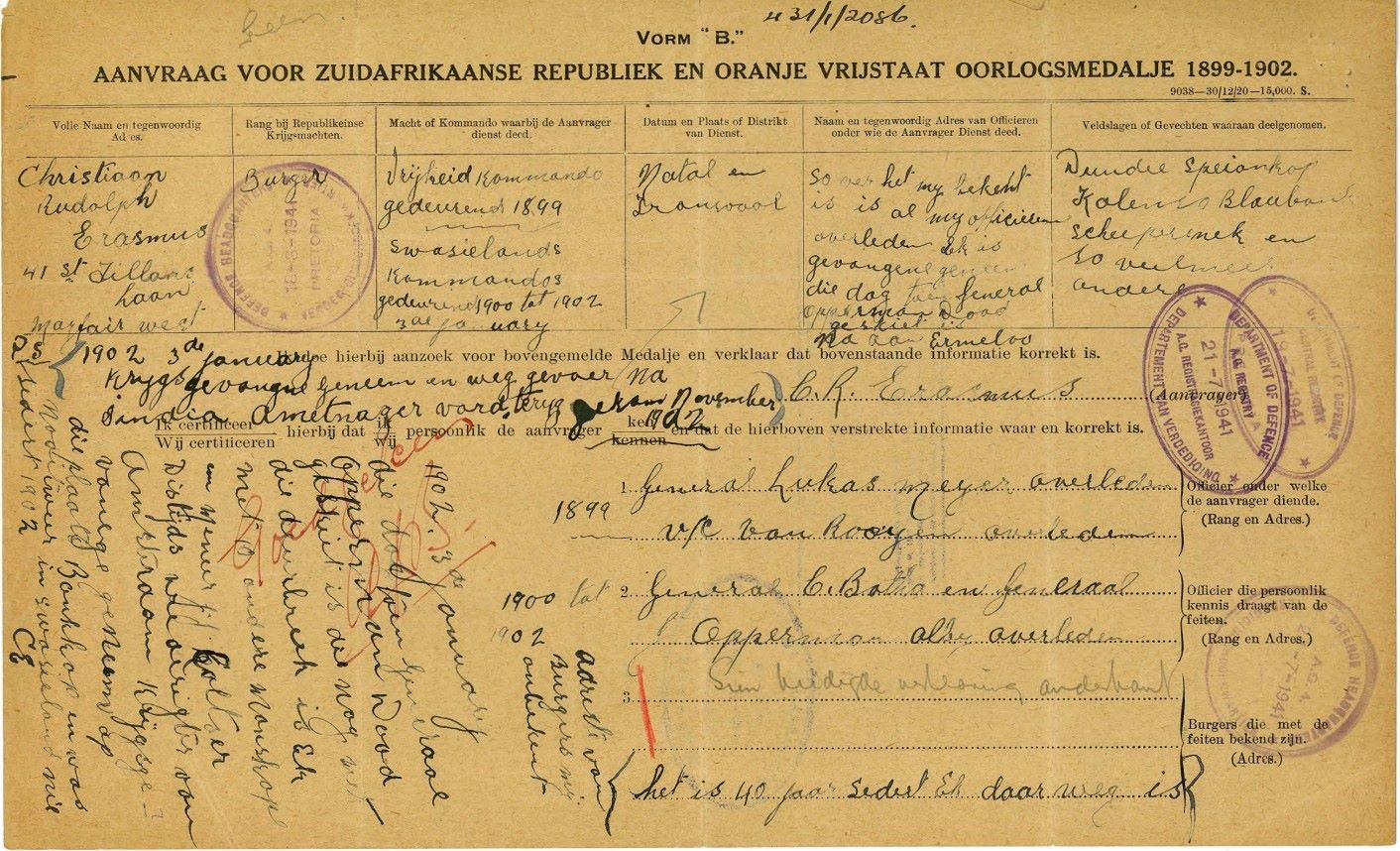
Completed application by Christiaan Rudolph Erasmus for the Medalje voor de Anglo-Boere Oorlog, 1941.

The Medalje voor de Anglo-Boere Oorlog is a South African military campaign medal. It was instituted on 21 December 1920 as a retrospective award for Boer veteran officers and men who fought in the 1899–1902 Second Boer War.

== Institution ==
The Medalje voor de Anglo-Boere Oorlog, originally officially designated De Zuidafrikaanse Republiek- en Oranje Vrijstaat Oorlogsmedalje (the South African Republic and Orange Free State War Medal) and commonly referred to as the Anglo-Boere-Oorlog Medalje, was instituted in terms of Government Notice no. 2307 dated 21 December 1920, and published in the Union of South Africa Government Gazette of 24 December 1920. It was a retrospective campaign medal for Boer veteran officers and men, who served in the combat forces of the South African Republic and the Orange Free State during the Second Boer War between 11 October 1899 and 31 May 1902 and who remained in service of the Republican forces until 31 May 1902, without surrendering or taking either parole or the oath of allegiance prior to 31 May 1902.

Since neither of the two Boer Republics, the South African Republic (Transvaal) and the Orange Free State, had official honours systems of their own, the medal was created to afford Boer veteran officers and men, who were serving as members of the Union Defence Forces, parity with their fellow South Africans who had fought on the British side in the war.

Notices did appear in the Transvaal Government Gazette in May 1900 about the eventual issue of a decoration for bravery for Republican soldiers, but as a result of the eventual British victory, this did not materialise.

The Union Defence Forces (UDF) were established in 1912. In 1913, Colonel Skinner, Commandant of the Military School in Bloemfontein, remarked on the fact that some of the officers attending a course, who had fought valiantly in the Republican Forces, were without medal ribbons, whilst their brother officers who had served on the British side were all well decorated. Colonel Skinner made representations to Defence Headquarters to have this omission rectified but, due to the outbreak of the First World War, nothing was done about the matter until 1920, when the Dekoratie voor Trouwe Dienst, the Medalje voor de Anglo-Boere Oorlog and the Lint voor Verwonding were instituted.

== Award criteria ==
The Medalje voor de Anglo-Boere Oorlog was awarded, upon certified application, to veterans who had served in the Boer forces between 11 October 1899 and 31 May 1902 and who remained in service until 31 May 1902, without surrendering or taking either parole or the oath of allegiance. Recipients had to be serving members of the Union Defence Forces, or available to be called up for service in terms of the South Africa Defence Act 1912.

== Order of wear ==
Campaign medals and stars are not listed by name in the order of wear prescribed by the British Central Chancery of the Orders of Knighthood, but are all grouped together as taking precedence after the Queen's Medal for Chiefs and before the Polar Medals, in order of the date of the campaign for which awarded.

However, even though the Republican awards for the Anglo-Boer War, the Dekoratie voor Trouwe Dienst and the two campaign awards, the Medalje voor de Anglo-Boere Oorlog and the Lint voor Verwonding, were instituted on behalf of King George V by His Royal Highness, the Governor General of the Union of South Africa, the Dekoratie voor Trouwe Dienst is not listed in the British order of wear and the two campaign awards would therefore most likely also have been excluded.

=== South Africa ===
In the South African order of wear, the Medalje voor de Anglo-Boere Oorlog took precedence in wearing after the Queen's South Africa Medal and before the Lint voor Verwonding, which has the status of a campaign medal even though it has no accompanying medal.

With effect from 6 April 1952, when a new South African set of decorations and medals was instituted to replace the British awards used to date, the older British decorations and medals applicable to South Africa continued to be worn in the same order of precedence but, with the exception of the Victoria Cross, took precedence after all South African orders, decorations and medals awarded to South Africans on or after that date. Amongst the official British campaign medals which were applicable to South Africans, the Medalje voor de Anglo-Boere Oorlog takes precedence as shown.

- Preceded by the Queen's South Africa Medal.
- Succeeded by the Lint voor Verwonding.

== Description ==
The medal was struck in silver and is a disk, 1 7/16 inches (37 millimetres) in diameter and 1/8 inch (3 millimetres) thick at the raised rim. It is affixed to a fixed bar suspender by means of claws and a pin through the upper edge of the medal. The rank, initials and surname of the recipient is impressed in block capitals on the rim.

Equal sides

Neither side of the medal is considered as the reverse. Both sides depict an ornamental frame, encircled around the perimeter by the words "ANGLO-BOERE OORLOG" above and the years "1899 • 1902" below. One side has the coat of arms of the South African Republic in the centre of the frame and the other side has that of the Orange Free State. This enabled each recipient to wear the medal so as to display the coat of arms of the state under whose flag he had fought.

Ribbon

The ribbon is 1 1/4 inches (32 millimetres) wide and in the combined colours of the two former Republics. While these colours were gazetted as red, green, white, blue and orange, the orange appears as yellow on the actual ribbons. As worn by a South African Republic veteran, it has an 11½ millimetres wide green band, a 3 millimetres wide red band, a 3 millimetres wide white band, a 3 millimetres wide blue band and an 11½ millimetres wide orange band. An Orange Free State veteran would wear the ribbon and medal reversed, with the orange (yellow) band to the left.

== Recipients ==
The gazetted regulations, which stipulated actual service until 31 May 1902, excluded many men who had fought on the Boer side, such as the members of the various foreign units and potentially also the Natal and Cape rebels. Many early applications from overseas volunteers were unsuccessful, since the members were not actually in the field at the end of the war. The first medal was awarded on 28 October 1921.

In later years, these rules were interpreted more loosely and the eventual requirement for the award of the medal, was proof that the applicant had fought against the British without surrendering or taking either parole or the oath of allegiance prior to 31 May 1902. This resulted in medal awards to those previously excluded men.

While nearly one hundred thousand Burghers took up arms in the Republican Forces during the war, a relatively small percentage of those who had served were awarded the medal, probably due to the period of almost twenty years which had elapsed between the end of the war and the institution of the medal, as well as the fact that the medal had to be applied for. Only approximately 13,800 medals were awarded.

Of the medals which were eventually awarded to members of the various foreign units who fought on the Boer side, at least ninety went to members of the Hollander Corps, about forty to members of the Scandinavian Corps, more than twenty to the German Commando, ten to the Foreign Legion under General de Villebois-Mareuil and five to the Irish Brigade. Nineteen medals were awarded to women, of which two were school teachers who had served as voluntary nurses, while the rest were trained nurses.

== Discontinuation ==
The original closing date for applications was 30 June 1921, but this was not strictly adhered to. The last batch of twelve of the Medalje voor de Anglo-Boere Oorlog was awarded in 1982, eighty years after the end of the war. One of these was awarded to Burgher Herman Carel Lubbe, who joined the Fauresmith Commando under Commandant Charles Nieuwoudt at the age of twelve years when his mother was taken to the concentration camp in Kimberley. It was presented to him on 24 January 1983 in his hometown of Carolina by Major General Neil Webster, Chairman of the Council of Military Veterans Organisations.
