= Queen's Mediterranean Medal =

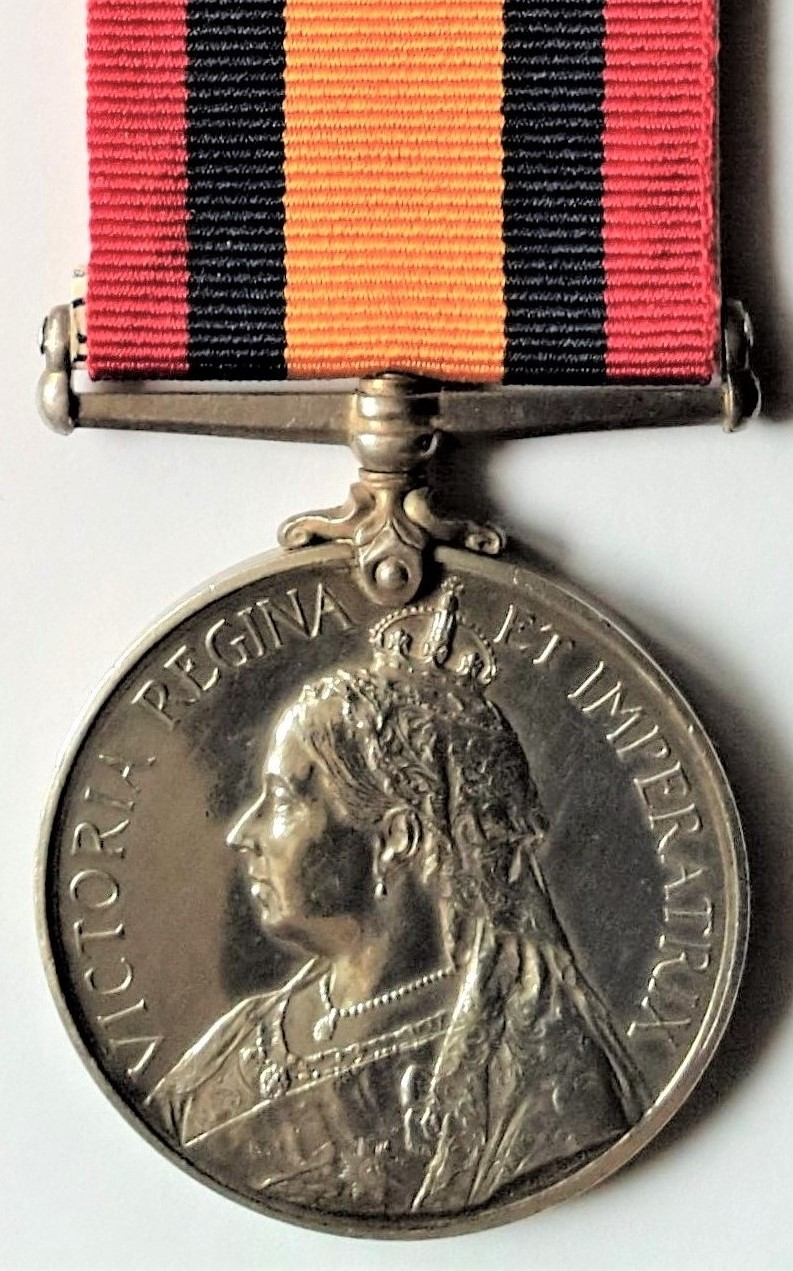
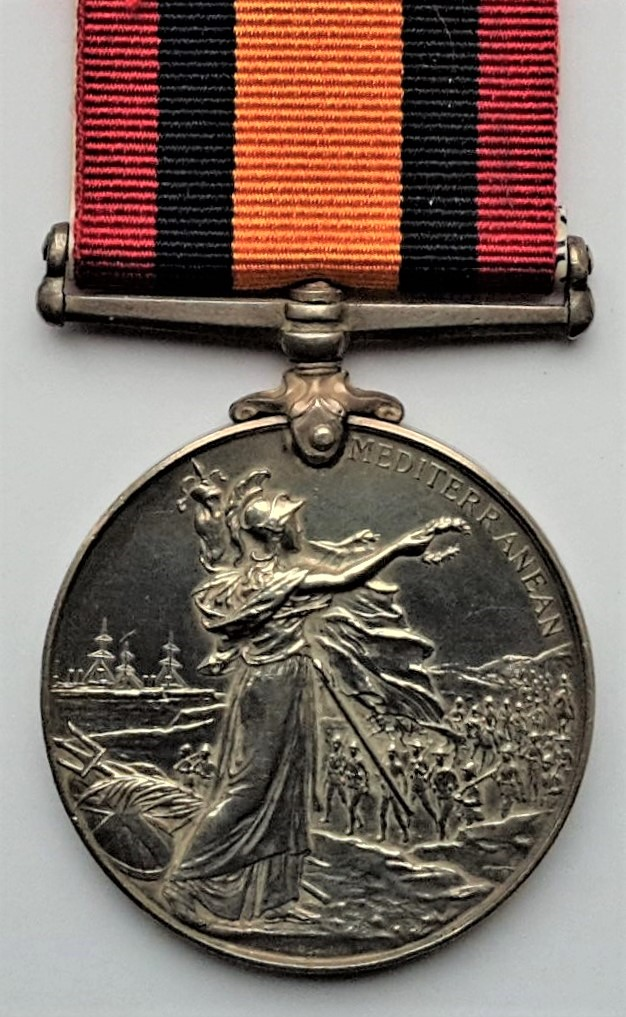
- Obverse and reverse of the medal.
- Type: Campaign medal
- Awarded for: Campaign service
- Description: Silver disk 36 mm wide
- Presented by: United Kingdom of Great Britain and Ireland
- Eligibility: British Army
- Campaign: Boer War 1899-1902
- Clasps: None
- Established: 1902
- Total: 5,000
- Ribbon bar

The Queen's Mediterranean Medal was a British campaign medal authorised by King Edward VII. It was awarded to Militia troops who had replaced their regular British Army counterparts in the various military garrisons across the Mediterranean, in Gibraltar, Malta and Egypt. This allowed regular troops to be available for the Second Boer War.

Troops on the island of St. Helena who guarded Boer prisoners of war in the POW camp were awarded the Queen's South Africa Medal without clasp.

The medal and ribbon are identical to the Queen's South Africa Medal 1899-1902 except the inscription 'SOUTH AFRICA' has been replaced by the word 'MEDITERRANEAN' on the reverse of the medal. No clasps were awarded. The recipient's name and details were impressed on the rim of the medal.

== Recipients ==
Approximately 5,000 of the Queen's Mediterranean Medal were awarded. They were issued to eligible officers and men in the Third (Militia) Battalions of the: Royal Northumberland Fusiliers, Royal Fusiliers, West Yorkshire Regiment, Royal North Lancashire Regiment, Royal West Kent Regiment, King's Own Yorkshire Light Infantry, Seaforth Highlanders and the Royal Munster Fusiliers.
