= Dekoratie voor Trouwe Dienst =

South African military decoration for Boer officers of the Second Boer War

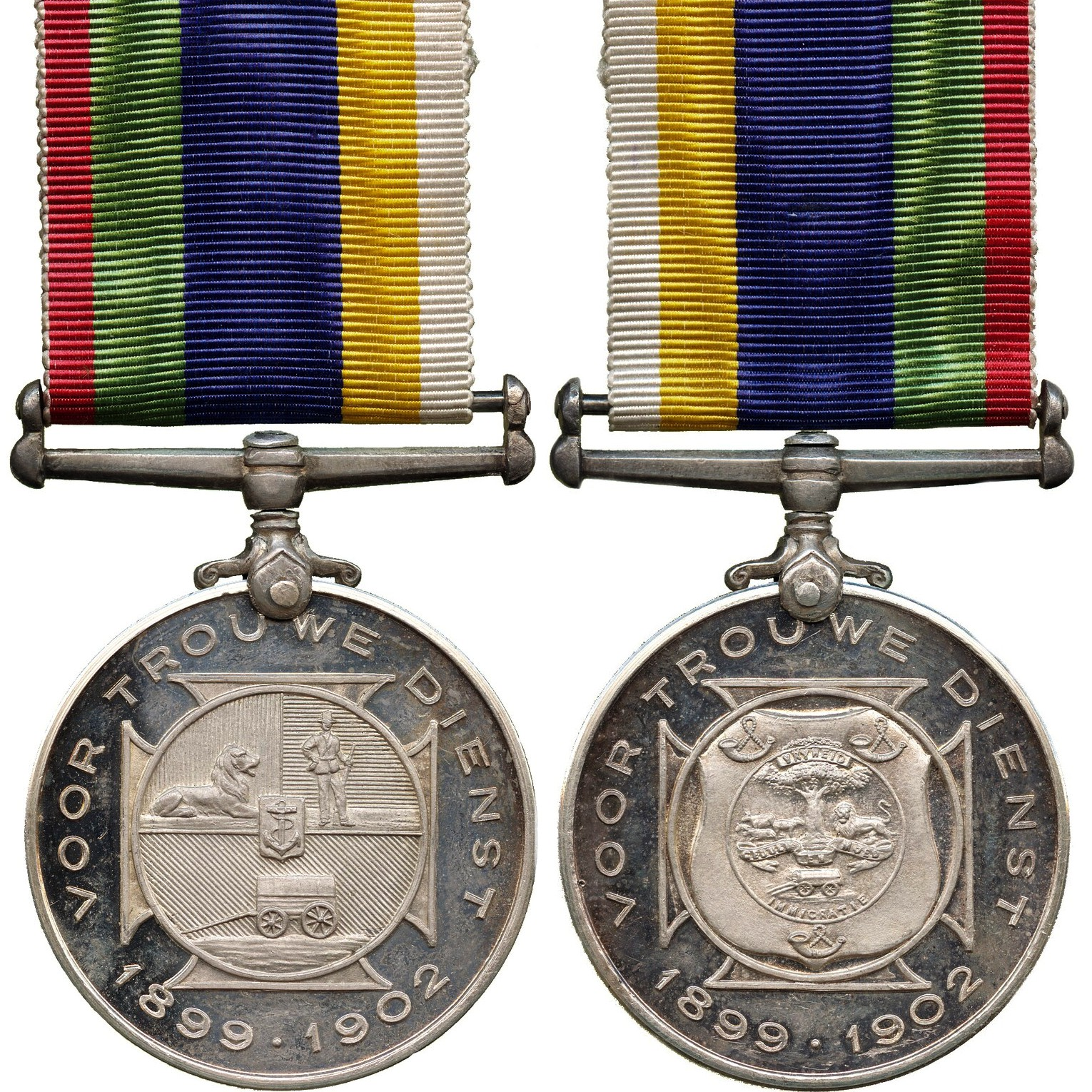
- SAR and OFS sides
- Type: Military decoration for merit
- Awarded for: Distinguished and meritorious service
- Country: South Africa
- Presented by: the Monarch of the United Kingdom and the British Dominions, and Emperor of India
- Eligibility: Boer military veteran officers
- Campaign: 1899–1902 Second Boer War
- Status: Discontinued in 1946
- Established: 1920
- First award: 1921
- Final award: 1946

Highlights
- Total: 655
- SAR and OFS ribbon bar orientations

SADF pre-1994 & SANDF post-2002 orders of wear
- Next (higher): SADF precedence: National Cadet Bisley Grand Champion Medal; SANDF precedence: State President's Medal for Shooting
- Next (lower): SADF succession: Distinguished Service Order; SANDF succession: Distinguished Service Order

The Dekoratie voor Trouwe Dienst, post-nominal letters DTD, is a South African military decoration. It was instituted in 1920 as a retrospective award for Boer officers of the 1899–1902 Second Boer War.

== Institution ==
The Dekoratie voor Trouwe Dienst (Decoration for Devoted Service), post-nominal letters DTD, was instituted in terms of Government Notice no. 2307 dated 21 December 1920 and published in the Union of South Africa Government Gazette of 24 December 1920. It was a retrospective award for distinguished and especially meritorious service by Boer veteran officers during the Second Boer War between 11 October 1899 and 31 May 1902.

Since neither of the two Boer Republics, the South African Republic (Transvaal) and the Orange Free State, had official honours systems of their own, the decoration was created to afford Boer veteran officers who were serving as members of the Union Defence Forces parity with their fellow South Africans who had fought on the British side in the war.

During the Second Boer War, Republican commanders were instructed to record the names of members of their forces who distinguished themselves in the field. The names were to be sent to the War Council for confirmation and publication in the Staats Courant (Government Gazette) with the intention to award a medal after conclusion of hostilities. Since the Republican forces were defeated, however, the intended medal never became a reality.

The Union Defence Forces (UDF) were established in 1912. In 1913, Colonel Skinner, Commandant of the Military School in Bloemfontein, remarked on the fact that some of the officers attending a course, who had fought valiantly in the Republican Forces, were without medal ribbons whilst their brother officers, who had served on the British side, were all well decorated. Colonel Skinner made representations to Defence Headquarters to have this omission rectified but, due to the outbreak of the First World War, nothing was done about the matter until 1920, when the Dekoratie voor Trouwe Dienst, the Medalje voor de Anglo-Boere Oorlog and the Lint voor Verwonding were instituted by King George V.

== Award criteria ==
The Dekoratie voor Trouwe Dienst could be awarded to officers of the military forces of the South African Republic and the Orange Free State whose service during the Second Boer War of 1899 to 1902 had been of such a distinguished and meritorious nature that, in the opinion of the Minister of Defence, they deserved special recognition. Recipients had to be serving members of the Union Defence Forces, or available to be called up for service in terms of the South Africa Defence Act, 1912.

The gazetted regulations, in effect, actually excluded many men who had fought on the Boer side, such as the members of the various foreign units and potentially also the Natal and Cape rebels.

== Order of wear ==
Even though the Dekoratie voor Trouwe Dienst was instituted on behalf of King George V by His Royal Highness, the Governor General of the Union of South Africa, the decoration was never listed in the order of wear prescribed by the British Central Chancery of the Orders of Knighthood.

=== South Africa ===
Example of DTD and DSO South African order of wear, illustrated by the medal group of Major C.W. Cloete. The medals depicted are: Dekoratie voor Trouwe Dienst; Distinguished Service Order; Medalje voor de Anglo-Boere Oorlog; 1914-15 Star; British War Medal; Victory Medal (South Africa)

In the South African order of wear, however, the Dekoratie voor Trouwe Dienst took precedence in wearing and officially ranked above the British Distinguished Service Order. With effect from 6 April 1952, when a new South African set of decorations and medals was instituted to replace the British awards used to date, the older awards continued to be worn in the same order of precedence but, with the exception of the Victoria Cross, took precedence after all South African orders, decorations and medals awarded to South Africans on or after that date.

The official South African order of wear was revised in 1994 to include the military decorations and medals of the defence forces of the Republics of Transkei, Bophuthatswana, Venda and Ciskei which were integrated with the South African Defence Force (SADF) into the South African National Defence Force (SANDF) on 27 April 1994.

South African Defence Force until 26 April 1994

- Official SADF order of precedence:
  - Preceded by the National Cadet Bisley Grand Champion Medal.
  - Succeeded by the Distinguished Service Order (DSO) of the United Kingdom.
- Official national order of precedence:
  - Preceded by the George Cross (GC) of the United Kingdom.
  - Succeeded by the Distinguished Service Order (DSO) of the United Kingdom.

South African National Defence Force from 27 April 1994

- Official SANDF order of precedence:
  - Preceded by the State President's Medal for Shooting of the Republic of Bophuthatswana.
  - Succeeded by the Distinguished Service Order (DSO) of the United Kingdom.
- Official national order of precedence:
  - Preceded by the George Cross (GC) of the United Kingdom.
  - Succeeded by the Distinguished Service Order (DSO) of the United Kingdom.

The position of the Dekoratie voor Trouwe Dienst in the official order of wear remained unchanged in April 1996, when decorations and medals were belatedly instituted for the two former non-statutory forces, the Azanian People's Liberation Army and Umkhonto we Sizwe, and again upon the institution of a new set of awards on 27 April 2003.

== Description ==
The decoration was struck in silver and is a disk, 1 7/16 inches (37 millimetres) in diameter and 1/8 inch (3 millimetres) thick at the raised rim. It is affixed to a fixed bar suspender by means of claws and a pin through the upper edge of the medal. The rank and name of the recipient are impressed on the rim.

Equal sides

Neither side of the decoration is considered as the reverse. Both sides depict an encircled coat of arms on a cross pattée, encircled around the perimeter by the words "VOOR TROUWE DIENST" above and the years "1899 • 1902" below. One side has the coat of arms of the South African Republic in the centre of the cross and the other side has that of the Orange Free State. This enabled each recipient to wear the medal so as to display the coat of arms of the state under whose flag he had fought.

Ribbon

The ribbon is 1 1/4 inches (32 millimetres) wide and in the combined colours of the two former Republics. While these colours were gazetted as red, green, white, blue and orange, the orange appears as yellow on the actual ribbons. As worn by a South African Republic veteran, it has a 12 millimetres wide blue band in the centre, edged by a 3 millimetres wide red and a 7 millimetres wide green bands on the left and a 7 millimetres wide orange and a 3 millimetres wide white bands on the right. An Orange Free State veteran would wear the ribbon reversed, with the white band at left.

== Recipients ==
Altogether 655 decorations were awarded between 1921 and 1946, all but one to officers. The sole exception was the award to Burgher A. Kuit, who was awarded the decoration for his service whilst occupying the position of Inspekteur van Veldpos (Inspector of Field Post).

A complete list of recipients of the Dekoratie voor Trouwe Dienst was published in the Military History Journals of the South African Military History Society, Volume 1, Numbers 1 and 2, in December 1967 and June 1968 respectively.

== Discontinuation ==
The original closing date for applications was 30 June 1921, but this was not strictly adhered to. Award of the decoration was discontinued on 31 December 1946 and the last decoration was dispatched on 22 January 1947, to Kaptein M. C. Avis of General Smuts' Commando.
