= Queen's Medal for Chiefs =

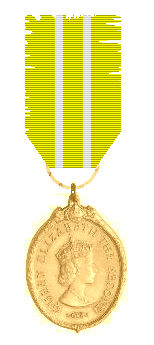
- Queen's Medal for Chiefs in Gold
- Type: Medal
- Presented by: the Sovereign of the British Empire
- Status: No longer awarded
- Established: 1920
- Queen's Medal for Chiefs in gold Queen's Medal for Chiefs in silver

Precedence
- Next (higher): Queen's Volunteer Reserves Medal
- Next (lower): Badge of Honour

The Queen's Medal for Chiefs is an award of the British Empire. The medal was established in 1920, during the colonial period. The medal was granted to the chiefs within the numerous African, Asian, American and Pacific colonies and mandated territories that made up the then very extensive British Empire. The medal is no longer awarded.

Medals were struck bearing the effigies of George V, George VI, and Elizabeth II. The earliest versions of the medal were worn on a silver chain. Later medals were suspended from a yellow ribbon with two white stripes for the gold medal and yellow with a single white center stripe for the silver medal.

== Medal designs ==
In 1920, the medal was a silver oval 67 mm by 50.2 mm on a silver chain 78 cm in length. The links of the chain took the form of Tudor roses, the royal monogram "GRI", and crowns. The design was by Sir Bertram Mackennal. On the obverse was the effigy of the King-Emperor George V surrounded by the inscription GEORGE V KING AND EMPEROR. The reverse depicts a freighter and a battleship in a tropical port.

In 1953 the medal was a silver oval 67.8 mm by 50 mm on a silver chain 82 cm in length. The links were in the form of Tudor roses, the royal monogram "EIIR", and crowns. The obverse bears the effigy of Elizabeth II by Cecil Thomas surrounded by the inscription QUEEN ELIZABETH THE SECOND. The reverse remained unchanged between versions.

After 1953, the medals were hung from a yellow ribbon with white stripes. The medals followed the prior obverse and reverse designs but were of a smaller size, 49.9 mm by 33.9 mm. This medal was struck by the Royal Mint.
