= Mosoeu Magalefa =

South African admiral (1949–2014)

- Born: 21 April 1949; Johannesburg
- Died: 27 May 2014 (aged 65)
- Military career
- Allegiance: South Africa
- Branch: South African Navy
- Rank: Rear Admiral
- Commands: Chief of Naval Staff

Rear Admiral Mosoeu Magalefa (21 April 1949 - 27 May 2014) was a South African Navy officer, who served as Chief of Naval Staff. He retired from the Navy in 2009.

== Military career ==
While at school he joined the Pan Africanist Congress (PAC) in 1963 and joined the Azanian People's Liberation Army (APLA) in 1967.

He went into exile in 1977 and completed Military training courses in Tanzania and Libya, the People's Republic of China, Sudan and Yugoslavia.

He returned to South Africa in the 1990s and integrated in the SANDF in 1996 and completed the Officers Orientation Course in 1997, the Naval Senior Staff Course in 1998. He served as Chief of Naval Staff Intelligence (1998–1999); Director Naval Personnel (1999–2001); Director Naval Review Co-ordination and Implementation (2002–2005); and Chief of Naval Staff from 2005 till his retirement.

== Awards and decorations ==
- Operational Medal for Southern Africa
- South Africa Service Medal
- Unitas (Unity) Medal
- Medalje vir Troue Diens (Medal for Loyal Service) (40 Year Clasp)
- Service Medal (Gold)
- Service Medal (Silver) (SSM)
- Service Medal (Bronze)

Military offices
Preceded by Refiloe Johannes Mudimu	Chief of Naval Staff; 2005 – 2009	Succeeded by George Mphafi
Preceded by	Director Naval Review Co-ordination and Implementation; 2002 – 2005	Succeeded by
Preceded by Steve van H. du Toit as CNS Personnel	Director Naval Personnel; 1999 – 2001	Succeeded by
Preceded by	Chief of Naval Staff Intelligence; 1998 – 1999	Succeeded by
