= Gilbert Ramano =

South African military commander (1939–2025)

Lieutenant General Gilbert Ramano SSAS SD MMS MMM MMB
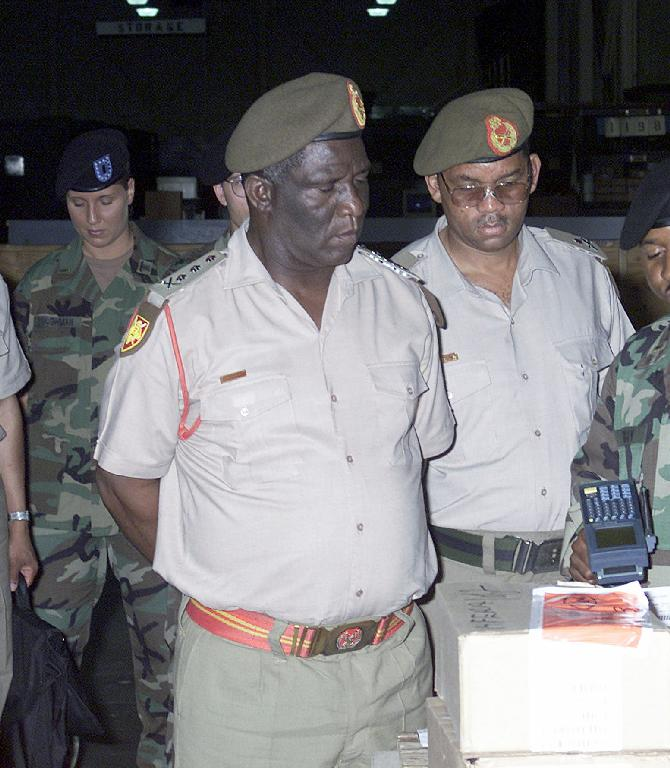
- Ramano in 2001
- Born: 7 July 1939; Sophiatown, Transvaal Province, South Africa
- Died: 8 June 2025 (aged 85)
- Military career
- Allegiance: South Africa
- Branch: South African Army
- Service years: 1964 – 2004
- Rank: Lieutenant General
- Commands: Chief of the South African Army; Deputy Chief of the South African Army; GOC Northern Cape Command
- Conflicts: Struggle for Liberation of South Africa
- Awards: Star of South Africa SSAS Southern Cross Decoration SD Merit Medal MMS Military Merit Medal MMM Merit Medal MMB Operational Medal for Southern Africa South Africa Service Medal Unitas (Unity) Medal Medal for Distinguished Conduct and Loyal Service Service Medal Legion of Merit LOM Order of Military Merit
- Other work: RSA Mediator to Sudan

Lieutenant General Gilbert Lebeko Ramano SSAS SD MMS MMM MMB (7 July 1939 – 8 June 2025) was a South African military commander.

== Life and career ==
Ramano was born in Sophiatown on 7 July 1939. He completed his schooling at Madibane High School and worked as a senior clerk at the WNLA mines depot in Johannesburg from 1961 to 62.

He left South Africa in 1962 to join the armed wing of the African National Congress, uMkhonto we Sizwe (MK). He attended a number of military courses in Tanzania, Egypt (special operations), and the Soviet Union, including a Soviet Army Staff Course in 1971. He returned to South Africa in 1992 and attended the Zimbabwe National Army Staff Course in 1994.

In 1995, he attended the SANDF Joint Staff Course and was appointed General Officer Commanding Northern Cape Command in July of that year.

In May 1997 he was appointed Deputy Chief of the Army and on 1 July 1998 he was promoted to lieutenant general and appointed Chief of the Army.

Ramano died on 8 June 2025, at the age of 85.

== Honours and awards ==
In 1999, Lt General Ramano was awarded the Order of the Star of South Africa His awards include the following:

- Star of South Africa (Silver) (SSAS)
- Southern Cross Decoration (SD)
- Merit Medal (Silver) (MMS)
- Military Merit Medal (MMM)
- Merit Medal (Bronze) (MMB)
- Operational Medal for Southern Africa
- South Africa Service Medal
- Unitas (Unity) Medal
- Medal for Distinguished Conduct and Loyal Service (40 Years)
- Service Medal (Gold)
- Service Medal (Silver)
- Service Medal (Bronze)
- Legion of Merit (Commander) (LOM)
- Order of Military Merit (Grand Officer - Grande-Oficial)

== See also ==
- List of South African military chiefs

Military offices
Preceded by Lt Gen Reginald Otto	Chief of the South African Army; 1998–2004	Succeeded by Lt Gen Solly Shoke
Preceded by Maj Gen Jonny Coetzer	Deputy Chief of the South African Army; 1997–1998	Succeeded by Maj Gen Roland de Vries
Preceded by Maj Gen Vos Benade	GOC Northern Cape Command; 1995–1997	Succeeded by Maj Gen Aaron Ntshinga
