= Wilson Nqose =

General

Major General Wilson Nqose (Rtd)
- Born: c. 1943; Retreat, South Africa
- Military career
- Allegiance: South Africa
- Branch: SAMHS; Umkhonto we Sizwe
- Service years: 1961–1994 (MK); 1994–2005 (SANDF)
- Rank: Major General
- Nickname: Wilson Msweli
- Commands: Chief of Service Corps (2002–2005)
- Awards: Operational Medal for Southern Africa South Africa Service Medal Unitas (Unity) Medal Service Medal

Wilson Nqose (born Zolile Nqose) is a former chief of Service Corps in the South African National Defence Force, and a former founding member of the African National Congress's military wing, uMkhonto we Sizwe (MK).

== Military career ==
General Nqose joined MK in 1961, being one of the youngest members to join and receive military training in the Soviet Union. In 1964, he was briefly based at Tanzania, before moving to Zambia in preparation for the Wankie battle. Nqose was part of the Wankie Sipolilo Campaign in 1967, alongside Lennox Lagu, Zola Skweyiya and Chris Hani that fought and lost against the South African and Rhodesian Armies. He escaped imprisonment and returned to Zambia

He later joined the South African National Defence Force, when MK was integrated into it in 1994, as a brigadier. Nqose was promoted to major general in the late 1990s, before replacing Andrew Masondo as the chief of the Service Corps in 2001.

He retired in 2005. Dawn: Journal of Umkhonto we Sizwe, Souvenir Issue, 1986

== Honours and awards ==
- Operational Medal for Southern Africa
- South Africa Service Medal
- Unitas (Unity) Medal
- Service Medal (Gold)
- Service Medal (Silver)
- Service Medal (Bronze)

Military offices
Preceded by Andrew Masondo	Chief of SANDF Service Corps; 2001–2003	Succeeded by Kenneth Mokoena
