= Bongani Mbatha =

Lieutenant General Bongani Mbatha MMB
- Born: Bongani Isidore Mbatha; 1957
- Died: 2015 (aged 57–58)
- Military career
- Allegiance: South Africa
- Branch: South African Army
- Service years: 1994–2015
- Rank: Lieutenant General
- Commands: Chief of Logistics
- Awards: Merit Medal MMB South Africa Service Medal General Service Medal (South Africa) Unitas (Unity) Medal Mandela Commemoration Medal Medalje vir Troue Diens (Medal for Loyal Service) Good Service Medal Service Medal

Lieutenant General Bongani Mbatha MMB was a South African Army officer who served as Chief of Logistics for the South African National Defence Force from 2014–2015.

== Awards and decorations ==
- Merit Medal (Bronze) (MMB)
- South Africa Service Medal
- General Service Medal (South Africa)
- Unitas (Unity) Medal
- Mandela Commemoration Medal (Gold)
- Medalje vir Troue Diens (Medal for Loyal Service) (30 Year Clasp)
- Good Service Medal (Silver (20 Years))
- Service Medal (Bronze)

Military offices
Preceded by Justice Nkonyane	Chief of Logistics; 2014–2015	Succeeded by Morris Moadira
Unknown	Chief of Army Force Structure; 2011–2014	Succeeded by Luvuyo Nobanda
