= Andrew Masondo =

South African mathematician and general

Lieutenant General Andrew Masondo DMG MMM
- Born: 27 October 1936; Retreat, South Africa
- Died: 20 April 2008 (aged 71); 1 Military Hospital, Pretoria
- Children: 5, including Vusumuzi Masondo
- Military career
- Allegiance: South Africa
- Branch: South African Army; Umkhonto we Sizwe
- Service years: 1961–1994 (MK); 1994–2001 (SANDF)
- Rank: Lieutenant General
- Commands: Chief of Service Corps (1999–2001)
- Awards: Decoration for Merit DMG Military Merit Medal MMM Operational Medal for Southern Africa South Africa Service Medal Unitas (Unity) Medal Service Medal

Lieutenant General Andrew Masondo, DMG MMM born Andrew Mandla Lekoto Masondo (27 October 1936 – 20 April 2008) was a South African mathematician, political prisoner, a former general in the South African National Defence Force (SANDF), and a national commissar of the African National Congress's military wing, Umkhonto weSizwe,

== Early life and education ==
Andrew Masondo was born on 27 October 1936 in Sophiatown, Johannesburg, to Alois Emmanuel Mathanjane Masondo, and Elsie Seraka Masondo. He was raised in a working class African family who believed in the value of education. After completing Grade 12 in 1954, Masondo went to Fort Hare University and majored in physics and mathematics. He completed his BSc in 1957 and, in the following year, became one of the first two black students to complete the BSc (Honours) degree in applied mathematics at the University of the Witwatersrand. In 1959, these two students completed the one-year University Education Diploma at Fort Hare, again the first black students to do so. By 1960, Masondo was lecturing pure and applied mathematics at the University of Fort Hare. His wide reading and cultural interaction with other scholars as well as the township community helped to develop an individual in touch with diverse groups of people.

== Military career and activism ==
In 1953, Andrew Masondo joined the African National Congress (ANC). In 1962/3, he held several posts within the structure of the ANC in the Eastern Cape, mainly as a rural area organiser but also in the higher command structure. In 1963, as the command director of the underground Umkhonto we Sizwe (MK) movement, the military wing of the ANC, he began to take part in sabotage activities in South Africa, cutting electricity pylons in the vicinity of Alice, armed with a number of devices, including a saw and an old rifle he had found buried in a garden.

=== Awards ===
- Decoration for Merit (Gold) (DMG)
- Military Merit Medal (MMM)
- Operational Medal for Southern Africa
- South Africa Service Medal
- Unitas (Unity) Medal
- Service Medal (Gold)
- Service Medal (Silver)
- Service Medal (Bronze)

== Imprisonment ==
Masondo was arrested in 1963 and sentenced to twelve years' imprisonment on Robben Island, where he was later joined by top Rivonia trialists such as Govan Mbeki, Walter Sisulu, and Nelson Mandela. In 1964, he was sentenced to an additional three years, two of which would be served concurrently with his original sentence, bringing the total to thirteen years. In prison, Masondo again turned to education. Through UNISA, he completed second-year mathematical statistics and third-year mathematics for the second time and obtained his BSc (Honours) in Mathematical Statistics. In 1975, he registered for a BCom in statistics, but did not complete the course after losing his study privileges when he intervened to defend Walter Sisulu and Govan Mbeki in a case of alleged insubordination against a white man.

== Release from prison and exile ==
Andrew Masondo was released from prison in 1976 and placed under house arrest. With the help of Oliver Tambo and his wife, he escaped to Swaziland in June 1976. From there, he went to Mozambique and Tanzania. He received military training, including a commander's course and a course in guerilla warfare, in the Soviet Union. In Angola, he became a national commissar of the MK, as well as a member of the ANC's national executive and Revolutionary Council. From 1978 to 1990, he lectured at the Solomon Mahlangu Freedom College in Tanzania, becoming the principal of the college. After serving as an MK ambassador and underground commander in Uganda, he returned to Angola in 1994, to deal with the repatriation of MK soldiers in exile, returning to a new, democratic South Africa.

== Later career and retirement ==
Gen Masondo attended a Joint Staff Course at the Defence College, after the South African National Defence Force (SANDF) was established in April 1994, and subsequently promoted to the rank of major general. From 1994 until his retirement on 31 October 2001 with the rank of lieutenant-general, he held many posts - Chairman of the Integration Committee, Chief Director of Equal Opportunity, Chief Director of Corporate Communication, and Chief of the Service Corps. After his retirement, General Masondo remained active in the corporate, education, and heritage spheres of South African life. He served on numerous boards and committees in the fields of education, museums, indigenous knowledge, traditional healing, reconciliation and medicine.

== Death ==
Masondo was diagnosed with kidney failure in 2005, he died on Sunday 20 April 2008 in the One Military Hospital in Tshwane at the age of 71. He is survived by five children and six grandchildren.

Military offices
Preceded by Lambert Moloi	Chief of SANDF Service Corps; 1999–2001	Succeeded by Wilson Nqose
