= Percy Mokonopi =

General in the South African Army

Brigadier General Percy Mokonopi (Ret)
- Born: 1937; Bloemfontein, South Africa
- Died: 2002 (aged 64–65) unknown
- Spouse: Mary
- Children: 1
- Military career
- Allegiance: South Africa
- Branch: South African Army; uMkhonto we Sizwe
- Service years: 1961–1994 (MK); 1994–1999 (SANDF)
- Rank: Brigadier General
- Nicknames: Bra Max, Percy
- Commands: uMkhonto we Sizwe
- Awards: Operational Medal for Southern Africa South Africa Service Medal Unitas (Unity) Medal Service Medal

Percy Mokonopi was a former General in the South African National Defence Force, and a former founding member of the African National Congress's military wing, uMkhonto we Sizwe (MK).

== Military career ==
General Mokonopi joined MK at its inception in 1961, and immediately received military training in the Soviet Union, and in Cuba. During the 1962 Cuban Missile Crisis, he participated under the Cuban Armed Forces, as part of the uMkhonto we Sizwe contingent. In 1964, he was briefly based at Tanzania, before moving to Zambia in preparation for external deployment. He eventually was shifted away from MK activities, and was appointed as the African National Congress's Chief Representative to Angola and Finland. He later served on the World Peace Council, at its headquarters in Helsinki. He later joined the South African National Defence Force, when MK was incorporated into it in 1994 as a Brigadier General. Mokonopi was placed on special leave with full pay in 1999, after a string of misdemeanors.

=== Honours and awards ===
- Operational Medal for Southern Africa
- South Africa Service Medal
- Unitas (Unity) Medal
- Service Medal (Gold)
- Service Medal (Silver)
- Service Medal (Bronze)

== Disappearance ==
Mokonopi went missing in 2002, a couple of weeks after he was featured on the Documentary "Twelve Disciples of Nelson Mandela", and has never been found. He was survived by his wife, Mary, who died shortly after, and one child.
