= Phil du Preez =

South African military officer

Lieutenant General Phillip O. du Preez SD SM MMM
- Military career
- Allegiance: South Africa South Africa
- Branch: South African Army
- Service years: –1998
- Rank: Lieutenant General
- Nickname: Phil
- Unit: 10 Anti-Aircraft Regiment
- Commands: Chief of Staff Logistics; Deputy Chief of Staff Logistics; Chief of Army Staff Logistics
- Conflicts: Border War
- Awards: Southern Cross Decoration SD Southern Cross Medal SM Military Merit Medal MMM Pro Patria Medal (South Africa) Southern Africa Medal General Service Medal (South Africa) Unitas (Unity) Medal Medal for Distinguished Conduct and Loyal Service Good Service Medal
- Other work: National Chairman – Gunners Association of South Africa

Lieutenant General Phil du Preez SD SM MMM is a former Anti-Aircraft officer of the South African Army.

== Early life ==
Phil was born in a farm in Natal province and was schooled in the local schools until high school. Upon finishing matric, he enrolled at the SA Army Gymnasium at Voortrekkerhoogte, Pretoria.

== Military career ==
He served at the Anti-Aircraft Training Centre at Youngsfield from the early sixties after he graduated with bachelor's degree in science from the Military Academy and Stellenbosch University. He served as Battery Commander. Seconded to ARMSCOR for the acquisition of the Crotale defence system in France. He participated in Ops SAVANNAH as a Liaison Officer for UNITA in 1975. Chief of Army Staff Logistics, Deputy Chief of Staff Logistics. He succeeded V Adm A.G. Malherbe as Chief of Staff Logistics from 1995 to 1998. Concurrently served as General of the Gunners from 1993 until 1998. He retired from the SANDF in 1998.

== Awards and decorations ==
General of the Gunners (Post)
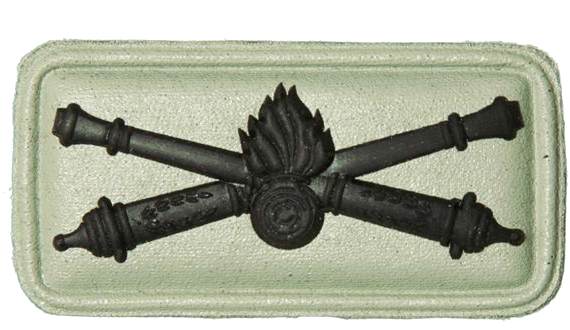
Black on Thatch beige, Embossed. Crossed gun barrels with grenade

- Southern Cross Decoration (SD)
- Southern Cross Medal (1975) (SM)
- Military Merit Medal (MMM)
- Pro Patria Medal (South Africa) (with Cunene Clasp) (Note: Only the Cunene clasp was awarded, to members who served in Angola during Operation Savannah in 1975 and 1976. Recipients of the clasp wear a button, with the letter C encircled by a wreath, on the ribbon bar.)
- Southern Africa Medal
- General Service Medal (South Africa)
- Unitas (Unity) Medal
- Medal for Distinguished Conduct and Loyal Service (40 Years)
- Good Service Medal (Gold (30 Years))
- Good Service Medal (Silver (20 Years))
- Good Service Medal (Bronze (10 Years))

== Notes ==
Honorary titles
Preceded by Maj Gen Paul Lombard	General of the Gunners; 1993–1998	Succeeded by Maj Gen Chris van Zyl
Preceded by Maj Gen (Ret) Phil Pretorius	National President of the Gunners Association; 2011–2020	Succeeded by Maj Gen Roy Andersen
Military offices
Preceded by V Adm Aart Malherbe	Chief of Staff Logistics; 1995–1998	Succeeded by Lt Gen Piet Coetser
Unknown	Chief of Army Staff Logistics; 1993–1995	Succeeded by Maj Gen Piet Coetser
Preceded by Brig Louis Oosthuizen	Director Projects; 1985–1987	Succeeded by Brig Tony Savides
