= Kenneth Pickersgill =

South African Army general (born 1936)

Lieutenant General Kenneth Mervwyn Pickersgill SSAS SM
- Born: 26 October 1936 (age 89)
- Military career
- Allegiance: Union of South Africa; South Africa
- Branch: South African Army
- Service years: –1991
- Rank: Lieutenant General
- Nickname: Ken
- Commands: Chief of Staff Logistics; Quartermaster General SADF
- Awards: Star of South Africa SSAS Southern Cross Medal SM Good Service Medal

Lieutenant General Kenneth Pickersgill SSAS SM (born 26 October 1936) is a former South African Army officer, who served as Chief of Staff Logistics from 1 July 1989 to 1991.He served as quartermaster general (1982–1989).

== Awards and decorations ==
- Star of South Africa (Silver) (SSAS)
- Southern Cross Medal (1975) (SM)
- Good Service Medal (Gold (30 Years))
- Good Service Medal (Silver (20 Years))
- Good Service Medal (Bronze (10 Years))

Military offices
Preceded by Ivan Lemmer	Chief of Staff Logistics; 1990–1991	Succeeded by Aart Malherbe
Preceded by Bert Bekker	Quartermaster General SADF; 1982–1990	Closed down
