= Lennox Lagu =

Lieutenant General Mongameli Johnson Tshali

MK Chief of Staff
- In office 1967–1975
- Preceded by: Lambert Moloi
- Succeeded by: Joe Slovo

ANC Chief Representative for Mozambique
- In office 1975–1983

Personal details
- Born: 16 October 1938 Port Elizabeth, South Africa
- Died: September 7, 2011 (aged 72)
- Awards: Operational Medal for Southern Africa South Africa Service Medal Unitas (Unity) Medal Service Medal
- Nickname(s): Mxwako, Lennox Lagu

Military service
- Allegiance: South Africa
- Branch/service: South African Army; UMkhonto we Sizwe
- Years of service: 1961–1999
- Rank: Lieutenant General
- Commands: uMkhonto we Sizwe
- Battles/wars: Wankie-Sipolilo Campaign

Lennox Lagu, born Mongameli Johnson Tshali (16 October 1938 – 7 September 2011) was a commander of Umkhonto we Sizwe (MK), the armed wing of the African National Congress (ANC). He was a major general in the South African National Defence Force (SANDF). He was posthumously promoted to Lieutenant General, and the only general in the history of South African military to be promoted posthumously. He opposed the apartheid government.

== Early life ==
Mongameli Tshali was born in Port Elizabeth on 16 October 1938, and was the eldest child. He did his primary and senior secondary schooling at Upper United Mission School and Newell High School in New Brighton respectively. He decided to join the fight against apartheid at a young age and left Port Elizabeth to join the struggle.

Whilst in exile in Zambia, Tshali married Olipah Tshali until her death in 2002. They had 4 children Sebenzile Tshali, Zamile Tshali, Zuzeka Tshali and Sanele Tshali.

== Military career ==
Tshali joined the ANC and MK in 1961; he served in various capacities until his return to South Africa in 1992. He served as an MK commander in the former Union of Soviet Socialist Republic (USSR), Tanzania, Angola, Zambia, Zimbabwe and Mozambique. He served as the ANC Chief Representative in Mozambique between 1975 and 1983. In 1967–1968, Tshali was the deputy commander of the Luthuli Contingent which fought alongside Zimbabwean People’s Revolutionary Army (ZIPRA) forces in the Wankie Sipolilo campaign.

In 1994, Tshali was integrated into the SANDF where he obtained the rank of major general and served the South African Army as the leader of Project Juggernaut which dealt with issues of troop discipline.

== Awards and decorations ==
- Operational Medal for Southern Africa
- South Africa Service Medal
- Unitas (Unity) Medal
- Service Medal (Gold)
- Service Medal (Silver)
- Service Medal (Bronze)
