= Lambert Moloi =

South African military commander

Lieutenant General Lambert Sekenku Ntsike Lehlohonolo Moloi OMSS MMM
- Born: 25 December 1932; Quting, Basotholand British Protectorate
- Died: 23 December 2013 (aged 80); Johannesburg
- Military career
- Allegiance: South Africa
- Branch: South African Army; Umkhonto we Sizwe
- Service years: 1962–1994 Umkhonto we Sizwe; 1994–1999 South African National Defence Force
- Rank: Lieutenant General
- Commands: Chief of Service Corps; Umkhonto we Sizwe
- Awards: Order for Meritorious Service OMSS Military Merit Medal MMM Operational Medal for Southern Africa South Africa Service Medal Unitas (Unity) Medal Service Medal

General Lambert Moloi, born Lehlohonolo Moloi OMSS MMM, was a South African military commander, and a former commander of the African National Congress's military wing, Umkhonto weSizwe.

== Military career ==
General Moloi was born in 1932, in Quting, Lesotho. In 1940 his family moved to South Africa to join his father, who was a railway worker in Braamfontein, Johannesburg. He attended school in Soweto until 1963, when he left the country to join the African National Congress's armed wing Umkhonto we Sizwe (MK). He returned to Lesotho, where he lived in exile, and worked there with assassinated South African Communist Party general secretary Chris Hani until he was transferred to Lusaka in the early 1980s. He served as an MK commander the entire time. Moloi worked in MK's operations department, responsible for the deployment and infiltration of members into the country. On his return to South Africa, he played a major role in the negotiations to ensure MK members were integrated into the then newly-formed SANDF, which he joined as a general officer. At the time of his death Moloi was a member of the newly-established Defence Service Commission, which was formed to look after the conditions of service of members.

== Chair of Cell C ==
Moloi Co-founded the Cell C, CellSAF and 3C Telecommunications company in 1998 and was appointed as its chairman.

== Awards and decorations ==
- Order for Meritorious Service (Silver) (OMSS)
- Military Merit Medal (MMM)
- Operational Medal for Southern Africa
- South Africa Service Medal
- Unitas (Unity) Medal
- Service Medal (Gold)
- Service Medal (Silver)
- Service Medal (Bronze)

Military offices
Preceded by New	Chief of SANDF Service Corps; 1995–1998	Succeeded by Andrew Masondo
