= Piet Coetser =

South African Military General Officer

Lieutenant General Petrus Paul Johannes Coetser SD SM MMM
- Pieter
- Born: Petrus Paul Johannes Coetser; 16 June 1943; Pretoria
- Died: 2 April 2000 (aged 56); Pretoria, Gauteng
- Burial place: Ashes strewn on dune in Chintsa East, Eastern Cape
- Spouse: Annemari Coetser (Bredenkamp)
- Relatives: Maj Gen Choccy Coetser (father)
- Military career
- Allegiance: South Africa; South Africa
- Branch: Army
- Service years: 1961–2000
- Rank: Lieutenant General
- Nickname: P.P.J.
- Commands: Chief of Joint Support; Chief of Logistics; Chief of Army Staff Logistics; OC Army Logistical Command
- Conflicts: Border War
- Awards: Southern Cross Decoration SD Southern Cross Medal SM Military Merit Medal MMM Pro Patria Medal Unitas (Unity) Medal Good Service Medal

Lieutenant General Piet Coetser was a lieutenant general in the South African Army, who served as Chief of Logistics from 1 April 1998 to 2000.

== Early life ==
He grew up in a military family as his father was a World War II veteran. Wilhelmus J. Coetser - his father - was also a logistician. He would later become Directing Staff at the Military College, OC South West Africa Command and finally Chief Director Logistical Support at Log Division.

== Military career ==
Pieter was a graduate of Military Academy, Stellenbosch University and the South African Army College. He served in the Border War as an OC of a Forward Logistics Component. He served as an Assistant Military Attaché to the United States of America and afterwards OC SA Army Logistical Command from 1989 with the rank of brigadier. He was one of the Project officers during integration, welcoming returning MK troops at the Air Force Base Hoedspruit. He was appointed at the Chief of Army Staff Logistics and in 1998 he was promoted to lieutenant general. He was appointed as the Chief of Logistics. His final appointment was as Chief of Joint Support at the Defense Secretariat. He died in April 2000.

== Awards and decorations ==
- Southern Cross Decoration (SD)
- Southern Cross Medal (1975) (SM)
- Military Merit Medal (MMM)
- Pro Patria Medal
- Unitas (Unity) Medal
- Good Service Medal (Gold (30 Years))
- Good Service Medal (Silver (20 Years))
- Good Service Medal (Bronze (10 Years))

Military offices
Preceded by Lt Gen Phil du Preez	Chief of Logistics; 1998 – 2000	Succeeded by R Adm Barend Visser
Preceded by Brig JW Roos	OC SA Army Log Command; 1989 – 1993	Succeeded by Brig K.J. Greeff
