= Steve van H. du Toit =

South African Navy admiral

Rear Admiral Stephanus van Heerden du Toit SM MMM
- Military career
- Allegiance: South Africa
- Branch: South African Navy
- Service years: 1964–1999
- Rank: Rear Admiral (Junior Grade)
- Nickname: Steve
- Commands: SSO Departmental Strategy, Planning Division; Director Personnel Service Systems; Chief of Naval Staff Personnel
- Awards: Southern Cross Medal SM Military Merit Medal MMM Pro Patria Medal Southern Africa Medal General Service Medal (South Africa) Unitas (Unity) Medal Good Service Medal

Rear Admiral (Junior Grade) Steve du Toit SM MMM is a retired Rear Admiral in the South African Navy and submariner, who served as Chief of Naval Staff Personnel at Navy HQ.

He completed the Naval Senior Command Staff course during 1975 and commanded the SAS Maria van Riebeeck from 1979, later OC SAS Saldanha. He was a Senior Staff Officer at Chief of Staff Planning, As a commodore at Navy HQ, he served as Chief of Naval Staff Personnel from 1992 to 1999. He retired in 1999.

== Honours and awards ==
- Southern Cross Medal (1975) (SM)
- Military Merit Medal (MMM)
- Pro Patria Medal
- Southern Africa Medal
- General Service Medal (South Africa)
- Unitas (Unity) Medal
- Good Service Medal (Gold (30 Years))
- Good Service Medal (Silver (20 Years))
- Good Service Medal (Bronze (10 Years))

Military offices
Preceded by Cdre Martyn Trainor	Chief of Naval Staff Personnel; 1992–1999	Succeeded by R Adm (JG) Mosoeu Magalefa as Director Naval Personnel
