= Ivan Lemmer =

South African Army officer (born 1931)

Lieutenant General Ivan Lemmer SSAS SD SM MMM
- Born: 11 January 1931
- Military career
- Allegiance: South Africa
- Branch: South African Army
- Service years: 1950–1988
- Rank: Lieutenant General
- Commands: Chief of Staff Logistics; Director Engineers; OC 1 Composite Construction Regiment; Chief Instructor Engineering Wing, School of Artillery and Armour
- Awards: Star of South Africa SSAS Southern Cross Decoration SD Southern Cross Medal SM Military Merit Medal MMM Good Service Medal Permanent Force Good Service Medal

Lieutenant General Ivan Lemmer SM (born 11 January 1931) was a former South African Army officer, who served as Chief of Staff Logistics.

== Army career ==
Lemmer joined the Permanent Force in 1950 and subsequently served as a transport and training officer at 16 Field Squadron and the School of Military Engineering (Kroonstad), respectively.

In 1964 he was appointed as Officer Commanding 1 Composite Construction Regiment and later Director Engineers at Army Headquarters. He was the Acting Chief of Staff Intelligence during 1977 and in 1978 he was promoted to the rank of Lieutenant General and appointed on July 1 as Deputy-Chief of Staff Logistics. He retired from the SADF with pension in 1989.

== Awards and decorations ==
- Star of South Africa (Silver) (SSAS)
- Southern Cross Decoration (SD)
- Southern Cross Medal (1952) (SM)
- Military Merit Medal (MMM)
- Good Service Medal (Gold (30 Years))
- Good Service Medal (Silver (20 Years))
- Permanent Force Good Service Medal

Military offices
Preceded by Hennie Kotze	Chief of Staff Logistics	Succeeded by Kenneth Pickersgill
Preceded by Hein du Toit	Chief of Staff Intelligence; 1977–1978	Succeeded by Pieter van der Westhuizen (acting)
