= Luvuyo Nobanda =

South African Army officer

Major General Luvuyo Nobanda
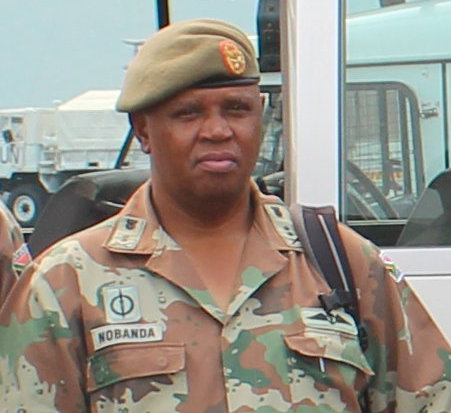
- Military career
- Allegiance: South Africa
- Branch: South African Army
- Rank: Major General
- Commands: Chief Director: Force Preparation; GOC South African Army Engineer Formation
- Awards: Transkei Defence Force Medal Military Rule Medal Unitas (Unity) Medal Medalje vir Troue Diens (Medal for Loyal Service) Good Service Medal Faithful Service Medal

Major General Luvuyo Nobanda is a South African Army officer. He is the current Chief Director: Force Preparation and past General Officer Commanding (GOC) South African Army Engineer Formation.

== Military career ==
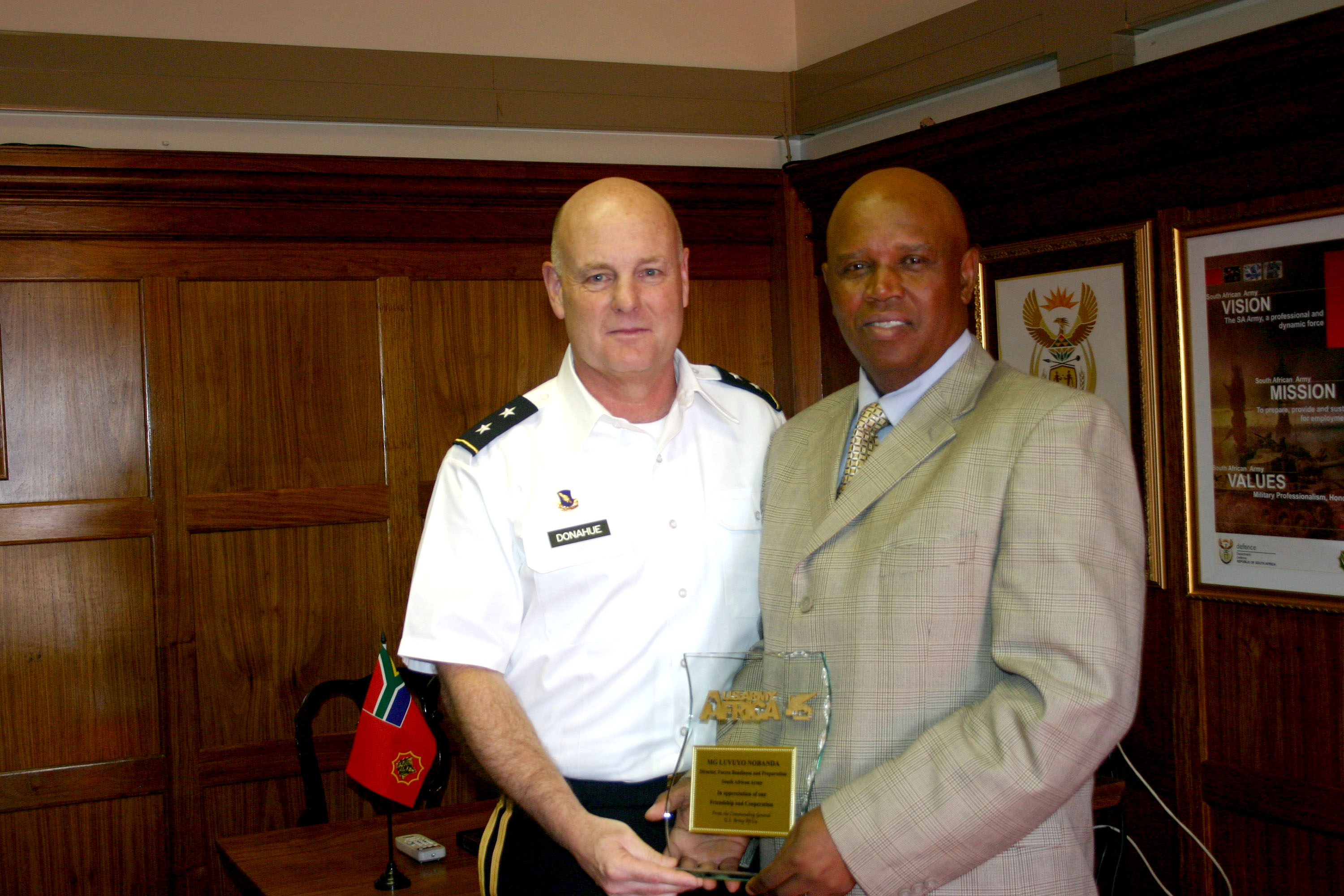
Maj. Gen. Patrick J. Donahue, commander of U.S. Army Africa, presents a plaque to Maj. Gen. Luvuyo Nobanda

General Nobanda was in charge of the safety and security for Nelson Mandela's funeral.

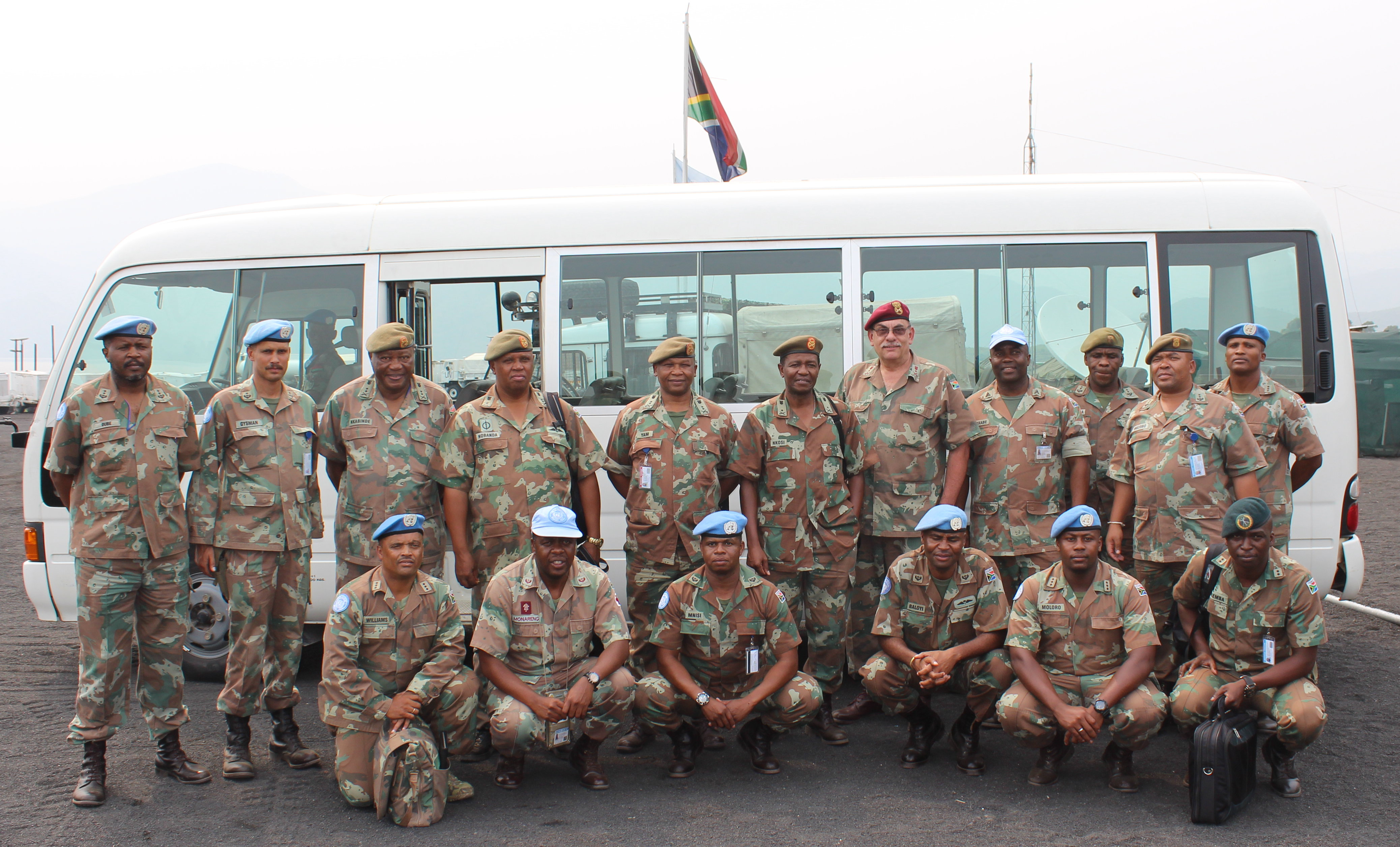
SANDF VIP Visit FIB DRC 2014.

== Awards and decorations ==
SA Special Forces Operator's Badge (Qualification)
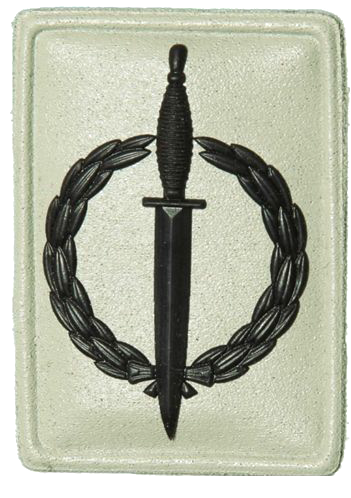
Black on Thatch beige, Embossed. Dagger enclosed with a laurel wreath

Paratrooper Basic (Qualification)
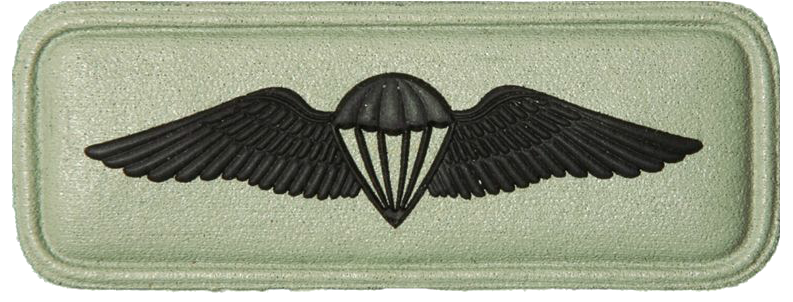
Basic, Static Line. Black on Thatch beige, Embossed. Small Black wings

General Nobanda was awarded the following:

- Transkei Defence Force Medal
- Military Rule Medal
- Unitas (Unity) Medal
- Medalje vir Troue Diens (Medal for Loyal Service) (10 Years)
- Good Service Medal (Silver (20 Years))
- Faithful Service Medal (10 Years)

Military offices
Unknown	GOC South African Army Support Formation; 2016–2018	Unknown
Preceded by Bongani Mbatha	Chief Director Force Structures; 2014–2015	Succeeded by Deon Holtzhausen
Preceded by Vusumuzi Masondo	Chief Director Force Preparation; 2011–2013	Succeeded by Nontobeko Mpaxa
Unknown	GOC South African Army Engineer Formation n.d.–2011	Succeeded by Mbulelo Msi
