= George Mphafi =

South African naval officer

Rear Admiral George Mphafi
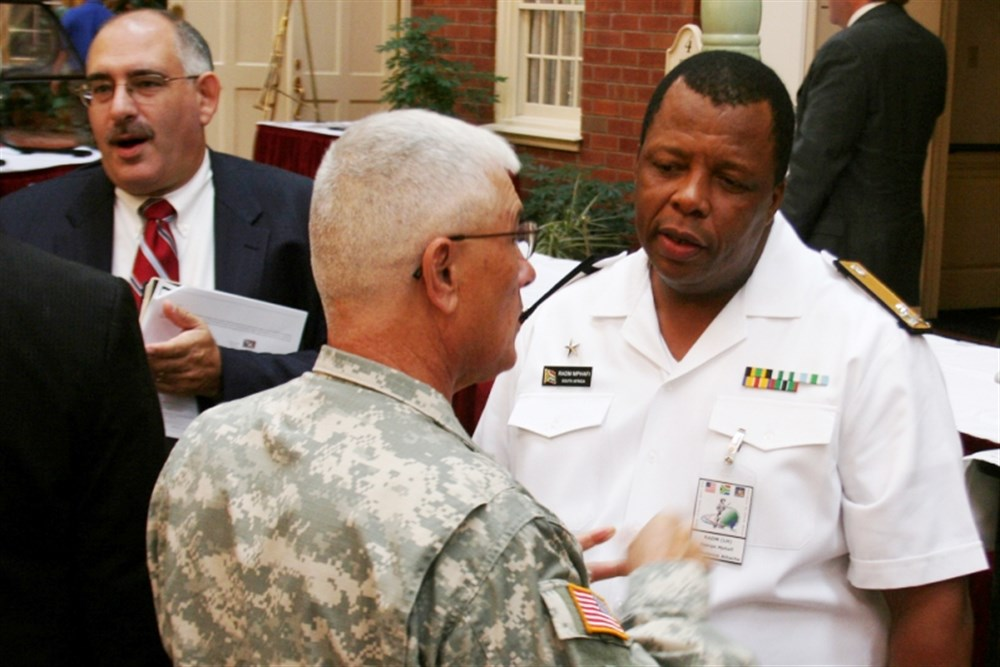
- Military career
- Allegiance: South Africa
- Branch: South African Navy
- Rank: Rear Admiral
- Commands: Chief Director Operations Development; Chief of Fleet Staff
- Awards: Operational Medal for Southern Africa South Africa Service Medal Unitas (Unity) Medal Good Service Medal Service Medal

Rear Admiral George Mphafi is a South African Navy officer, serving as Chief Director Operations Development at the Joint Operations Division.

He was the Officer Commanding of the South African Naval College until 2004.

He then served as Chief of Fleet Staff at Fleet Command before being appointed as Chief of Defence Foreign Relations with effect from 1 November 2004. This was followed by a stint as Defence Attaché in Washington

He served as Chief of Navy Staff until assuming his current position in November 2010.

== Awards and honours ==
- Operational Medal for Southern Africa
- South Africa Service Medal
- Unitas (Unity) Medal
- Good Service Medal (Silver (20 Years))
- Service Medal (Bronze)
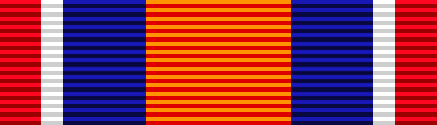
- Conspicuous Service Medal

He was awarded the Conspicuous Service Medal by the New York National Guard.

Military offices
Preceded by Mosoeu Magalefa	Chief of Naval Staff; 2009–2011	Succeeded by Robert W. Higgs
Preceded by Damian de Lange	Chief of Defence Foreign Relations; 2004–2006	Succeeded by Mohato Mofokeng
