= Long Service Medal, Bronze =

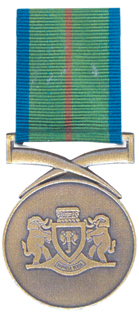
- Type: Military long service medal
- Awarded for: Ten years exemplary service
- Country: Venda
- Presented by: the President
- Eligibility: All Ranks
- Status: Discontinued in 1994
- Established: 1985
- Ribbon bar

VDF pre-1994 & SANDF post-2002 orders of wear
- Next (higher): VDF precedence: Long Service Medal, Silver; SANDF precedence: Medal for Long Service and Good Conduct, Bronze
- Next (lower): SANDF succession: De Wet Medal

The Long Service Medal, Bronze was instituted by the President of the Republic of Venda in 1985, for award to all ranks for ten years exemplary service.

== The Venda Defence Force ==
The 900 member Venda Defence Force (VDF) was established upon that country's independence on 13 September 1979. The Republic of Venda ceased to exist on 27 April 1994 and the Venda Defence Force was amalgamated with six other military forces into the South African National Defence Force (SANDF).

== Institution ==
The Long Service Medal, Bronze was instituted by the President of Venda in 1985. It is the junior award of a set of three medals for long service, along with the Long Service Medal, Gold and the Long Service Medal, Silver.

Venda's military decorations and medals were modelled on those of the Republic of South Africa and these three medals are the approximate equivalents of, respectively, the Good Service Medal, Gold, the Good Service Medal, Silver and the Good Service Medal, Bronze.

== Award criteria ==
The medal could be awarded to all ranks for ten years of exemplary service.

== Order of wear ==
Since the Long Service Medal, Bronze was authorised for wear by one of the statutory forces which came to be part of the South African National Defence Force on 27 April 1994, it was accorded a position in the official South African order of precedence on that date.

Venda Defence Force until 26 April 1994

- Official VDF order of precedence:
  - Preceded by the Long Service Medal, Silver.
- Venda official national order of precedence:
  - Preceded by the National Force Long Service Medal, 10 Years.
  - Succeeded by the Police Medal for Faithful Service.

South African National Defence Force from 27 April 1994

- Official SANDF order of precedence:
  - Preceded by the Medal for Long Service and Good Conduct, Bronze of the Republic of Bophuthatswana.
  - Succeeded by the De Wet Medal of the Republic of South Africa.
- Official national order of precedence:
  - Preceded by the Medal for Faithful Service in the Prisons Service of the Republic of Bophuthatswana.
  - Succeeded by the Police Medal for Faithful Service of the Republic of Venda.

The position of the Long Service Medal, Bronze in the official order of precedence was revised twice after 1994, to accommodate the inclusion or institution of new decorations and medals, first in April 1996 when decorations and medals were belatedly instituted for the two former non-statutory forces, the Azanian People's Liberation Army and Umkhonto we Sizwe, and again upon the institution of a new set of honours on 27 April 2003, but it remained unchanged on both occasions.

== Description ==
Obverse

The Long Service Medal, Bronze is a disk struck in bronze, 38 millimetres in diameter, depicting the Coat of Arms of the Republic of Venda.

The suspender is in the form of a pair of crossed elephant tusks and is different on the full-size and miniature medals. On the full-size medal, as depicted, the ends of the tusks reach to approximately the ten-thirty and one-thirty positions on the medallion, while on the miniature medal they reach to approximately the ten o'clock and two o'clock positions on the medallion.

Reverse

The reverse is inscribed with the number of years service in Tshivenda.

Ribbon

The ribbon is 32 millimetres wide and green, with 4 millimetres wide blue edges and a 2 millimetres wide brown band in the centre.

== Discontinuation ==
Conferment of the Long Service Medal, Bronze was discontinued when the Republic of Venda ceased to exist on 27 April 1994.
