= Aart Malherbe =

South African Vice Admiral

Vice Admiral Aart Gideon Malherbe SSAS, SD, SM, MMM
- Born: 30 November 1938 (age 87); Mosselbaai
- Military career
- Allegiance: South Africa; South Africa
- Branch: South African Navy
- Service years: 1968–1995
- Rank: Vice Admiral
- Commands: Chief of Staff Logistics
- Awards: Star of South Africa SSAS Southern Cross Decoration SD Southern Cross Medal SM Military Merit Medal MMM Unitas (Unity) Medal Good Service Medal

Vice Admiral Aart Malherbe SSAS SD SM MMM is a retired South African Navy officer who served as Chief of Staff Logistics before his retirement in 1995.

== Naval career ==
He was a mechanical engineer by profession and obtained a direct commission into the Navy in 1968. He specialised in corrosion treatment and logistics planning for the navy. He served at the Logistics Division from the late seventies until he was promoted to vice admiral in 1991.

== Awards and decorations ==
He was awarded the Star of South Africa, Silver in the 1994 National Honours.

- Star of South Africa (Silver) (SSAS)
- Southern Cross Decoration (SD)
- Southern Cross Medal (1975) (SM)
- Military Merit Medal (MMM)
- Unitas (Unity) Medal
- Good Service Medal (Silver (20 Years))
- Good Service Medal (Bronze (10 Years))

Military offices
Preceded by Kenneth Pickersgill	Chief of Staff Logistics; 1991–1995	Succeeded by Phil du Preez
