= Long Service Medal, Silver =

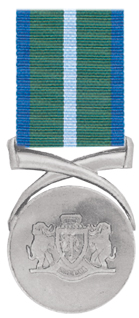
- Type: Military long service medal
- Awarded for: Twenty years exemplary service
- Country: Venda
- Presented by: the President
- Eligibility: All Ranks
- Status: Discontinued in 1994
- Established: 1985
- Ribbon bar

VDF pre-1994 & SANDF post-2002 orders of wear
- Next (higher): VDF precedence: Long Service Medal, Gold; SANDF precedence: Medal for Long Service and Good Conduct, Silver
- Next (lower): VDF succession: Long Service Medal, Bronze; SANDF succession: Service Medal in Silver

The Long Service Medal, Silver was instituted by the President of the Republic of Venda in 1985, for award to all ranks for twenty years exemplary service.

== The Venda Defence Force ==
The 900 member Venda Defence Force (VDF) was established upon that country's independence on 13 September 1979. The Republic of Venda ceased to exist on 27 April 1994 and the Venda Defence Force was amalgamated with six other military forces into the South African National Defence Force (SANDF).

== Institution ==
The Long Service Medal, Silver was instituted by the President of Venda in 1985. It is the middle award of a set of three medals for long service, along with the Long Service Medal, Gold and the Long Service Medal, Bronze.

Venda's military decorations and medals were modelled on those of the Republic of South Africa and these three medals are the approximate equivalents of, respectively, the Good Service Medal, Gold, the Good Service Medal, Silver and the Good Service Medal, Bronze.

== Award criteria ==
The medal could be awarded to all ranks for twenty years of exemplary service.

== Order of wear ==
Since the Long Service Medal, Silver was authorised for wear by one of the statutory forces which came to be part of the South African National Defence Force on 27 April 1994, it was accorded a position in the official South African order of precedence on that date. The position of the Long Service Medal, Silver in the official order of precedence was revised twice after 1994 to accommodate the inclusion or institution of new decorations and medals, first in April 1996 when decorations and medals were belatedly instituted for the two former non-statutory forces, the Azanian People's Liberation Army and Umkhonto we Sizwe, and again upon the institution of a new set of honours on 27 April 2003.

Venda Defence Force until 26 April 1994

- Official VDF order of precedence:
  - Preceded by the Long Service Medal, Gold.
  - Succeeded by the Long Service Medal, Bronze.
- Venda official national order of precedence:
  - Preceded by the National Force Long Service Medal, 20 Years.
  - Succeeded by the Police Medal for Loyal Service.

South African National Defence Force from 27 April 1994

- Official SANDF order of precedence:
  - Preceded by the Medal for Long Service and Good Conduct, Silver of the Republic of Bophuthatswana.
  - Succeeded by the Union Medal of the Union of South Africa.
- Official national order of precedence:
  - Preceded by the Police Star for Faithful Service of the Gazankulu Homeland.
  - Succeeded by the Police Medal for Loyal Service of the Republic of Venda.

South African National Defence Force from April 1996

- Official SANDF order of precedence:
  - Preceded by the Medal for Long Service and Good Conduct, Silver of the Republic of Bophuthatswana.
  - Succeeded by the Service Medal in Silver of Umkhonto we Sizwe.
- Official national order of precedence:
  - Preceded by the Police Star for Faithful Service of the Gazankulu Homeland.
  - Succeeded by the Police Medal for Loyal Service of the Republic of Venda.

The position of the Long Service Medal, Silver remained unchanged, as it was in April 1996, when a new set of honours was instituted on 27 April 2003.

== Description ==
Obverse

The Long Service Medal, Silver is a medallion struck in silver, 38 millimetres in diameter, depicting the Coat of Arms of the Republic of Venda.

The suspender is in the form of a pair of crossed elephant tusks and is different on the full-size and miniature medals. On the full-size medal, the ends of the tusks reach to approximately the eleven o'clock and one o'clock positions on the medallion, while on the miniature medal, as depicted, they reach to approximately the ten o'clock and two o'clock positions on the medallion.

Reverse

The reverse is inscribed "MENDELE WA VEHNKHXELA YA TSHIFHINGA TENILAFEY MHXWANA YA FUMBILE", the number of years service.

Ribbon

The ribbon is 32 millimetres wide, with a 4 millimetres wide blue band and a 10 millimetres wide green band, repeated in reverse order and separated by a 4 millimetres wide white band.

== Discontinuation ==
Conferment of the Long Service Medal, Silver was discontinued when the Republic of Venda ceased to exist on 27 April 1994.
