= Medal for Long Service and Good Conduct, Gold =

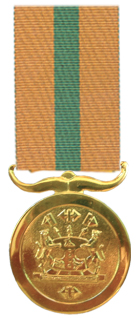
- Type: Military long service medal
- Awarded for: Thirty years service and good conduct
- Country: Bophuthatswana
- Presented by: the State President
- Eligibility: All ranks
- Status: Discontinued in 1994
- Established: 1982
- Ribbon bar

BDF pre-1994 & SANDF post-2002 orders of wear
- Next (higher): BDF precedence: Independence Medal; SANDF precedence: Good Service Medal, Gold
- Next (lower): BDF succession: Medal for Long Service and Good Conduct, Silver; SANDF succession: Long Service Medal, Gold

The Medal for Long Service and Good Conduct, Gold was instituted by the State President of the Republic of Bophuthatswana in 1982, for award to all ranks as a long service medal for thirty years service and good conduct.

== The Bophuthatswana Defence Force ==
The Bophuthatswana Defence Force (BDF) was established upon that country's independence on 6 December 1977. The Republic of Bophuthatswana ceased to exist on 27 April 1994 and the Bophuthatswana Defence Force was amalgamated with six other military forces into the South African National Defence Force (SANDF).

== Institution ==
The Medal for Long Service and Good Conduct, Gold was instituted by the State President of Bophuthatswana in 1982. It is the senior award of a set of three medals for long service and good conduct, along with the Medal for Long Service and Good Conduct, Silver and the Medal for Long Service and Good Conduct, Bronze.

Bophuthatswana's military decorations and medals were modelled on those of the Republic of South Africa and these three medals are the approximate equivalents of, respectively, the Good Service Medal, Gold, the Good Service Medal, Silver and the Good Service Medal, Bronze.

== Award criteria ==
The medal could be awarded to all ranks for thirty years service and good conduct.

== Order of wear ==
Since the Medal for Long Service and Good Conduct, Gold was authorised for wear by one of the statutory forces which came to be part of the South African National Defence Force on 27 April 1994, it was accorded a position in the official South African order of precedence on that date.

Bophuthatswana Defence Force until 26 April 1994

- Official BDF order of precedence:
  - Preceded by the Independence Medal.
  - Succeeded by the Medal for Long Service and Good Conduct, Silver.
- Bophuthatswana official national order of precedence:
  - Preceded by the Police Star for Merit.
  - Succeeded by the Medal for Faithful Service in the Prisons Service, Gold.

South African National Defence Force from 27 April 1994

- Official SANDF order of precedence:
  - Preceded by the Good Service Medal, Gold of the Republic of South Africa.
  - Succeeded by the Long Service Medal, Gold of the Republic of Venda.
- Official national order of precedence:
  - Preceded by the Prisons Medal for Faithful Service, Silver of the Republic of Transkei.
  - Succeeded by the Police Star for Merit of the KwaZulu Homeland.

The position of the Medal for Long Service and Good Conduct, Gold in the order of precedence remained unchanged, as it was on 27 April 1994, when decorations and medals were belatedly instituted in April 1996 for the two former non-statutory forces, the Azanian People's Liberation Army and Umkhonto we Sizwe, and again when a new series of military orders, decorations and medals was instituted in South Africa on 27 April 2003.

== Description ==
Obverse

The Medal for Long Service and Good Conduct, Gold is a silver-gilt medallion, 38 millimetres in diameter and 3 millimetres thick at the rim, with a 4 millimetres wide raised rim and displaying the Coat of Arms of the Republic of Bophuthatswana. The suspender depicts the horns of the Malete (African buffalo).

Ribbon

The ribbon is 32 millimetres wide and light brown, with a 6 millimetres wide green band in the centre.

== Discontinuation ==
Conferment of the Medal for Long Service and Good Conduct, Gold was discontinued when the Republic of Bophuthatswana ceased to exist on 27 April 1994.
