= Gold Service Medal =

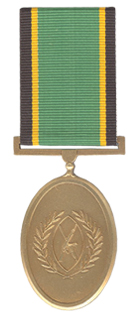
- Type: Military long service medal
- Awarded for: Thirty years service
- Country: South Africa
- Presented by: the President
- Eligibility: Azanian People's Liberation Army cadres
- Campaign: The "struggle"
- Status: Discontinued in 2003
- Established: 1996
- Ribbon bar

APLA 1996 & SANDF post-2002 orders of wear
- Next (higher): APLA precedence: South Africa Service Medal; SANDF precedence: Long Service Medal, Gold
- Next (lower): APLA succession: Silver Service Medal; SANDF succession: Service Medal in Gold

The Gold Service Medal was instituted by the President of the Republic of South Africa in April 1996. It was awarded to veteran cadres of the Azanian People's Liberation Army, the military wing of the Pan Africanist Congress, for thirty years service.

== Azanian People's Liberation Army ==
The Azanian People's Liberation Army (APLA) was the para-military wing of the Pan Africanist Congress (PAC). It was established in 1961 to wage an armed "struggle" against the Nationalist government inside South Africa. On 27 April 1994, the Azanian People's Liberation Army was amalgamated with six other military forces into the South African National Defence Force (SANDF).

== Institution ==
The Gold Service Medal was instituted by the President of South Africa in April 1996. It is the senior award of a set of three medals for long service, along with the Silver Service Medal and the Bronze Service Medal.

The Azanian People's Liberation Army's military decorations and medals were modelled on those of the South African Defence Force and these three medals are the approximate equivalents of, respectively, the Good Service Medal, Gold, the Good Service Medal, Silver and the Good Service Medal, Bronze.

== Award criteria ==
The medal could be awarded to veteran cadres of the Azanian People's Liberation Army for thirty years service.

== Order of wear ==
The position of the Gold Service Medal in the official military and national orders of precedence was revised upon the institution of a new set of honours on 27 April 2003, but it remained unchanged.

Azanian People's Liberation Army

- Official APLA order of precedence:
  - Preceded by the South Africa Service Medal.
  - Succeeded by the Silver Service Medal.

South African National Defence Force

- Official SANDF order of precedence:
  - Preceded by the Long Service Medal, Gold of the Republic of Venda.
  - Succeeded by the Service Medal in Gold of Umkhonto we Sizwe.
- Official national order of precedence:
  - Preceded by the Correctional Services Medal for Faithful Service, 30 Years of the KwaZulu Homeland.
  - Succeeded by the Service Medal in Gold of Umkhonto we Sizwe.

== Description ==
Obverse

The Gold Service Medal is a silver-gilt oval medallion with a raised edge, depicting the Azanian People's Liberation Army emblem.

Reverse

The reverse is smooth and displays the embellished pre-1994 South African Coat of Arms.

Ribbon

The ribbon is 32 millimetres wide, with a 4 millimetres wide black band and a 2 millimetres wide yellow band, repeated in reverse order and separated by a 20 millimetres wide green band in the centre.

== Discontinuation ==
Conferment of the Gold Service Medal was discontinued upon the institution of a new set of honours on 27 April 2003.
