= Silver Service Medal =

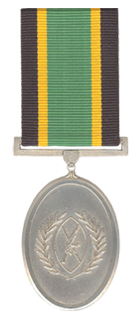
- Type: Military long service medal
- Awarded for: Twenty years exemplary service
- Country: South Africa
- Presented by: the President
- Eligibility: Azanian People's Liberation Army cadres
- Campaign: The "struggle"
- Status: Discontinued in 2003
- Established: 1996
- Ribbon bar

APLA 1996 & SANDF post-2002 orders of wear
- Next (higher): APLA precedence: Gold Service Medal; SANDF precedence: Service Medal in Silver
- Next (lower): APLA succession: Bronze Service Medal; SANDF succession: Medalje vir Troue Diens and Bar, 20 years

The Silver Service Medal was instituted by the President of the Republic of South Africa in April 1996. It could be awarded to veteran cadres of the Azanian People's Liberation Army, the military wing of the Pan Africanist Congress, for twenty years exemplary service.

== Azanian People's Liberation Army ==
The Azanian People's Liberation Army (APLA) was the para-military wing of the Pan Africanist Congress (PAC). It was established in 1961 to wage an armed "struggle" against the Nationalist government inside South Africa. On 27 April 1994, the Azanian People's Liberation Army was amalgamated with six other military forces into the South African National Defence Force (SANDF).

== Institution ==
The Silver Service Medal was instituted by the President of South Africa in April 1996. It is the middle award of a set of three medals for long service, along with the Gold Service Medal and the Bronze Service Medal.

The Azanian People's Liberation Army's military decorations and medals were modelled on those of the South African Defence Force and these three medals are the approximate equivalents of, respectively, the Good Service Medal, Gold, the Good Service Medal, Silver and the Good Service Medal, Bronze.

== Award criteria ==
The medal could be awarded to veteran cadres of the Azanian People's Liberation Army for twenty years exemplary service.

== Order of wear ==
The position of the Silver Service Medal in the official military and national orders of precedence was revised upon the institution of a new set of honours on 27 April 2003.

Azanian People's Liberation Army

- Official APLA order of precedence:
  - Preceded by the Gold Service Medal.
  - Succeeded by the Bronze Service Medal.

South African National Defence Force until 26 April 2003

- Official SANDF order of precedence:
  - Preceded by the Service Medal in Silver of Umkhonto we Sizwe.
  - Succeeded by the Union Medal of the Union of South Africa.
- Official national order of precedence:
  - Preceded by the Service Medal in Silver of Umkhonto we Sizwe.
  - Succeeded by the Medal for Faithful Service in the Prisons Service of the Republic of South Africa.

South African National Defence Force from 27 April 2003

- Official SANDF order of precedence:
  - Preceded by the Service Medal in Silver of Umkhonto we Sizwe.
  - Succeeded by the Medalje vir Troue Diens and Bar, 20 years of the Republic of South Africa.
- Official national order of precedence:
  - Preceded by the Service Medal in Silver of Umkhonto we Sizwe.
  - Succeeded by the Medalje vir Troue Diens and Bar, 20 years of the Republic of South Africa.

== Description ==
Obverse

The Silver Service Medal is an oval medallion with a raised edge, struck in silver and depicting the Azanian People's Liberation Army emblem.

Reverse

The reverse is smooth and displays the embellished pre-1994 South African Coat of Arms.

Ribbon

The ribbon is 32 millimetres wide, with a 6 millimetres wide black band and a 3 millimetres wide yellow band, repeated in reverse order and separated by a 14 millimetres wide green band in the centre.

== Discontinuation ==
Conferment of the Silver Service Medal was discontinued upon the institution of a new set of honours on 27 April 2003.
