= Medal for Long Service, Bronze =

- Type: Military long service medal
- Awarded for: Ten years faithful service
- Country: Ciskei
- Presented by: the President
- Eligibility: All Ranks
- Status: Discontinued in 1994
- Established: 1988
- Ribbon bar

CDF pre-1994 & SANDF post-2002 orders of wear
- Next (higher): CDF precedence: Independence Medal; SANDF precedence: Faithful Service Medal
- Next (lower): CDF succession: President's Medal for Shooting; SANDF succession: Bronze Service Medal

The Medal for Long Service, Bronze was instituted by the President of the Republic of Ciskei in 1988, for award to all ranks for ten years faithful service.

== The Ciskei Defence Force ==
The Ciskei Defence Force (CDF) was established upon that country's independence on 4 December 1981. The Republic of Ciskei ceased to exist on 27 April 1994 and the Ciskei Defence Force was amalgamated with six other military forces into the South African National Defence Force (SANDF).

== Institution ==
The Medal for Long Service, Bronze was instituted by the President of Ciskei in 1988. Ciskei's military decorations and medals were modelled on those of the Republic of South Africa and the Medal for Long Service, Bronze is the approximate equivalent of the Good Service Medal, Bronze.

== Award criteria ==
The medal could be awarded to all ranks for ten years of faithful service.

== Order of wear ==
Since the Medal for Long Service, Bronze was authorised for wear by one of the statutory forces which came to be part of the South African National Defence Force on 27 April 1994, it was accorded a position in the official South African order of precedence on that date. The position of the Medal for Long Service, Bronze in the official order of precedence was revised twice after 1994, to accommodate the inclusion or institution of new decorations and medals, first in April 1996 when decorations and medals were belatedly instituted for the two former non-statutory forces, the Azanian People's Liberation Army and Umkhonto we Sizwe, and again upon the institution of a new set of honours on 27 April 2003.

Ciskei Defence Force until 26 April 1994

- Official CDF order of precedence:
  - Preceded by the Independence Medal.
  - Succeeded by the President's Medal for Shooting.
- Ciskei official national order of precedence:
  - Preceded by the Police Medal for Faithful Service.
  - Succeeded by the Prisons Service Medal for Faithful Service.

South African National Defence Force from 27 April 1994

- Official SANDF order of precedence:
  - Preceded by the Faithful Service Medal of the Republic of Transkei.
  - Succeeded by the Queen's Medal for Champion Shots in the Military Forces of the United Kingdom.
- Official national order of precedence:
  - Preceded by the Faithful Service Medal of the Republic of Transkei.
  - Succeeded by the Prisons Service Medal for Faithful Service of the Republic of Ciskei.

South African National Defence Force from April 1996

- Official SANDF order of precedence:
  - Preceded by the Faithful Service Medal of the Republic of Transkei.
  - Succeeded by the Bronze Service Medal of the Azanian People's Liberation Army.
- Official national order of precedence:
  - Preceded by the Faithful Service Medal of the Republic of Transkei.
  - Succeeded by the Prisons Service Medal for Faithful Service of the Republic of Ciskei.

The position of the Medal for Long Service, Bronze in the official order of precedence remained unchanged upon the institution of a new set of honours on 27 April 2003.

== Description ==
Obverse

The Medal for Long Service, Bronze is a disk struck in bronze, 38 millimetres in diameter and 3 millimetres thick with a raised rim, displaying the Coat of Arms of the Republic of Ciskei.

Reverse

The reverse is plain with a raised rim and the inscription "IMBASA YENKONZO ENDE" in three lines.

Ribbon

The ribbon is 32 millimetres wide, with an 8 millimetres wide brown band and a 3 millimetres wide white band, repeated in reverse order and separated by a 10 millimetres wide blue band in the centre.

== Discontinuation ==
Conferment of the Medal for Long Service, Bronze was discontinued when the Republic of Ciskei ceased to exist on 27 April 1994.
