= Hennie Kotze =

South African general

Lieutenant General Hendrik A. Kotze SM
- Born: 1919
- Military career
- Allegiance: South Africa
- Branch: South African Army
- Rank: Lieutenant General
- Commands: Chief of Staff Logistics
- Wars: World War II; Korean War
- Awards: Southern Cross Medal SM Korea Medal (South Africa) Union Medal War Medal 1939–1945 Africa Service Medal (WWII) United Nations Service Medal Korean War Service Medal

Lieutenant General Hennie Kotze SM (born 1919) was a former South African Army officer, who served as Chief of Staff Logistics from 1975 to 1978.

== Army career ==
He joined the Union Defence Force in 1938. He saw action during the Second World War and the Korean War. Chief of Support Services in 1969. Quartermaster General SADF in 1974 and last served as Chief of Staff Logistics. He retired from the SADF with pension in 1979.

== Awards and decorations ==
- Southern Cross Medal (1952) (SM)
- Korea Medal (South Africa)
- Union Medal
- War Medal 1939–1945
- Africa Service Medal (WWII)
- United Nations Service Medal (Korea)
- Korean War Service Medal

Military offices
Preceded by H.P. Laubscher	Chief of Staff Logistics; 1975–1978	Succeeded by Ivan Lemmer
Preceded by R.C.J. van der Byl	Quartermaster general SADF; 1 August–31 December 1974	Succeeded by J.J. Steenkamp
