= Lagu =

Lagu may refer to:

- Balungan, a.k.a. Lagu, Indonesian gamelan musical ensemble's term for melody
- Laghu language, a.k.a. Lagu language, a near-extinct language once spoken in parts of the Solomon Islands
- Lagu (rune) (ᛚ), a rune of the Anglo-Saxon fuþorc
- Joseph Lagu
- Josephine Joseph Lagu
- Lennox Lagu
