= President's Medal for Shooting =

- Type: Military marksmanship medal
- Awarded for: Champion shot
- Country: Ciskei
- Presented by: the President
- Eligibility: All Ranks
- Status: Discontinued in 1994
- Established: 1988
- Ribbon bar

CDF pre-1994 & SANDF post-2002 orders of wear
- Next (higher): CDF precedence: Medal for Long Service, Bronze; SANDF precedence: National Cadet Bisley Grand Champion Medal
- Next (lower): SANDF succession: State President's Medal for Shooting

The President's Medal for Shooting was instituted by the President of the Republic of Ciskei in 1988, for award to champion shots.

== The Ciskei Defence Force ==
The Ciskei Defence Force (CDF) was established upon that country's independence on 4 December 1981. The Republic of Ciskei ceased to exist on 27 April 1994 and the Ciskei Defence Force was amalgamated with six other military forces into the South African National Defence Force (SANDF).

== Institution ==
The President's Medal for Shooting was instituted by the President of Ciskei in 1988.

== Award criteria ==
The medal was awarded to champion shots.

== Order of wear ==
Since the President's Medal for Shooting was authorised for wear by one of the statutory forces which came to be part of the South African National Defence Force on 27 April 1994, it was accorded a position in the official South African order of precedence on that date.

Ciskei Defence Force until 26 April 1994

- Official CDF order of precedence:
  - Preceded by the Medal for Long Service, Bronze.
- Ciskei official national order of precedence:
  - Preceded by the Prisons Service Medal for Faithful Service.

South African National Defence Force from 27 April 1994

- Official SANDF order of precedence:
  - Preceded by the National Cadet Bisley Grand Champion Medal of the Republic of South Africa.
  - Succeeded by the State President's Medal for Shooting of the Republic of Bophuthatswana.
- Official national order of precedence:
  - Preceded by the National Cadet Bisley Grand Champion Medal of the Republic of South Africa.
  - Succeeded by the State President's Medal for Shooting of the Republic of Bophuthatswana.

The position of the President's Medal for Shooting in the official order of precedence was revised twice after 1994, to accommodate the inclusion or institution of new decorations and medals, first in April 1996 when decorations and medals were belatedly instituted for the two former non-statutory forces, the Azanian People's Liberation Army and Umkhonto we Sizwe, and again upon the institution of a new set of honours on 27 April 2003, but it remained unchanged on both occasions.

== Description ==
Obverse

The President's Medal for Shooting is a medallion struck in nickel-silver, 38 millimetres in diameter and 3 millimetres thick with a raised rim, displaying two crossed military rifles within a wreath.

Reverse

The reverse is plain, with a raised rim and the inscription "INKCANI EYINTSHATSHELI KUMKHOSI WOKHUSELO WE CISKEI" in five lines.

Ribbon

The ribbon is 32 millimetres wide, with a 3 millimetres wide white band, a 10 millimetres wide green band and a 2 millimetres wide white band, repeated in reverse order and separated by a 2 millimetres wide black band in the centre.

== Discontinuation ==
Conferment of the President's Medal for Shooting was discontinued when the Republic of Ciskei ceased to exist on 27 April 1994.
