= Bronze Service Medal =

- Type: Military long service medal
- Awarded for: Ten years exemplary service
- Country: South Africa
- Presented by: the President
- Eligibility: Azanian People's Liberation Army cadres
- Campaign: The "struggle"
- Status: Discontinued in 2003
- Established: 1996
- Ribbon bar

APLA 1996 & SANDF post-2002 orders of wear
- Next (higher): APLA precedence: Silver Service Medal; SANDF precedence: Medal for Long Service, Bronze
- Next (lower): SANDF succession: Service Medal in Bronze

The Bronze Service Medal was instituted by the President of the Republic of South Africa in April 1996. It was awarded to veteran cadres of the Azanian People's Liberation Army, the military wing of the Pan Africanist Congress, for ten years of exemplary service.

== Azanian People's Liberation Army ==
The Azanian People's Liberation Army (APLA) was the para-military wing of the Pan Africanist Congress (PAC). It was established in 1961 to wage an armed "struggle" against the Nationalist government inside South Africa. On 27 April 1994 the Azanian People's Liberation Army was amalgamated with six other military forces into the South African National Defence Force (SANDF).

== Institution ==
The Bronze Service Medal was instituted by the President of South Africa in April 1996. It is the junior award of a set of three medals for long service, along with the Gold Service Medal and the Silver Service Medal.

The Azanian People's Liberation Army's military decorations and medals were modelled on those of the South African Defence Force and these three medals are the approximate equivalents of, respectively, the Good Service Medal, Gold, the Good Service Medal, Silver and the Good Service Medal, Bronze.

== Award criteria ==
The medal could be awarded to veteran cadres of the Azanian People's Liberation Army for ten years exemplary service.

== Order of wear ==
The position of the Bronze Service Medal in the official military and national orders of precedence was revised upon the institution of a new set of honours on 27 April 2003, but it remained unchanged.

Azanian People's Liberation Army

- Official APLA order of precedence:
  - Preceded by the Silver Service Medal.

South African National Defence Force until 26 April 2003

- Official SANDF order of precedence:
  - Preceded by the Medal for Long Service, Bronze of the Republic of Ciskei.
  - Succeeded by the Service Medal in Bronze of Umkhonto we Sizwe.
- Official national order of precedence:
  - Preceded by the Police Medal for Faithful Service of the QwaQwa Homeland.
  - Succeeded by the Service Medal in Bronze of Umkhonto we Sizwe.

== Description ==
Obverse

The Bronze Service Medal is an oval medallion with a raised edge, struck in bronze and depicting the Azanian People's Liberation Army emblem.

Reverse

The reverse is smooth and displays the embellished pre-1994 South African Coat of Arms.

Ribbon

The ribbon is 32 millimetres wide, with an 8 millimetres wide black band and a 4 millimetres wide yellow band, repeated in reverse order and separated by an 8 millimetres wide green band in the centre.

== Discontinuation ==
Conferment of the Bronze Service Medal was discontinued upon the institution of a new set of honours on 27 April 2003.
