= State President's Medal for Shooting =

- Type: Military marksmanship medal
- Awarded for: Champion shot
- Country: Bophuthatswana
- Presented by: the State President
- Eligibility: All ranks
- Status: Discontinued in 1994
- Established: 1990
- Ribbon design unknown

BDF pre-1994 & SANDF post-2002 orders of wear
- Next (higher): BDF precedence: Medal for Long Service and Good Conduct, Bronze; SANDF precedence: President's Medal for Shooting
- Next (lower): SANDF succession: Dekoratie voor Trouwe Dienst

The State President's Medal for Shooting was instituted by the State President of the Republic of Bophuthatswana in 1990, for award to champion shots.

== The Bophuthatswana Defence Force ==
The Bophuthatswana Defence Force (BDF) was established upon that country's independence on 6 December 1977. The Republic of Bophuthatswana ceased to exist on 27 April 1994 and the Bophuthatswana Defence Force was amalgamated with six other military forces into the South African National Defence Force (SANDF).

== Institution ==
The State President's Medal for Shooting was instituted by the State President of Bophuthatswana in 1990.

== Award criteria ==
The medal could be awarded to champion shots.

== Order of wear ==
Since the State President's Medal for Shooting was authorised for wear by one of the statutory forces which came to be part of the South African National Defence Force on 27 April 1994, it was accorded a position in the official South African order of precedence on that date.

Bophuthatswana Defence Force until 26 April 1994

- Official BDF order of precedence:
  - Preceded by the Medal for Long Service and Good Conduct, Bronze.
- Bophuthatswana official national order of precedence:
  - Preceded by the Medal for Faithful Service in the Prisons Service, Bronze.

South African National Defence Force from 27 April 1994

With effect from 6 April 1952, when a new South African set of decorations and medals was instituted to replace the British awards which were used to date, the older awards continued to be worn in the same order of precedence but, with the exception of the Victoria Cross, took precedence after all South African orders, decorations and medals awarded to South Africans on or after that date.

- Official SANDF order of precedence:
  - Preceded by the President's Medal for Shooting of the Republic of Ciskei.
  - Succeeded by the Dekoratie voor Trouwe Dienst (DTD) of the Union of South Africa.
- Official national order of precedence:
  - Preceded by the President's Medal for Shooting of the Republic of Ciskei.
  - Succeeded by the George Cross (GC) of the United Kingdom.

The position of the State President's Medal for Shooting in the order of precedence remained unchanged, as it was on 27 April 1994, when decorations and medals were belatedly instituted in April 1996 for the two former non-statutory forces, the Azanian People's Liberation Army and Umkhonto we Sizwe, and again when a new series of military orders, decorations and medals was instituted in South Africa on 27 April 2003.

== Discontinuation ==
Conferment of the State President's Medal for Shooting was discontinued when the Republic of Bophuthatswana ceased to exist on 27 April 1994.
