= De Wet Medal =

Military long service medal in the Republic of South Africa

- Type: Military long service medal
- Awarded for: Ten years loyal service and good conduct
- Country: South Africa
- Presented by: the State President and, from 1994, the President
- Eligibility: Members of the Commandos
- Status: Discontinued in 2003
- Established: 1987
- First award: 1991
- Ribbon bar

SADF pre-1994 & SANDF post-2002 orders of wear
- Next (higher): SADF precedence: Good Service Medal, Bronze; SANDF precedence: Long Service Medal, Bronze
- Next (lower): SADF succession: Queen's Medal for Champion Shots in the Military Forces; SANDF succession: Faithful Service Medal

The De Wet Medal is a military long service medal which was instituted by the Republic of South Africa in 1987. It was awarded to members of the Commandos, the rural defence component of the South African Defence Force, for ten years of efficient service and good conduct.

== The South African military ==
The Union Defence Forces (UDF) were established in 1912 and renamed the South African Defence Force (SADF) in 1958. On 27 April 1994, it was integrated with six other independent forces into the South African National Defence Force (SANDF).

== Institution ==
The De Wet Medal was instituted by the State President in 1987. It was named after Second Boer War General Christiaan de Wet.

== Award criteria ==
The De Wet Medal was instituted in 1987. It was awarded to members of the Commandos, the rural defence component of the South African Defence Force, for ten years of efficient service.

== Order of wear ==
The position of the De Wet Medal in the official order of precedence was revised twice, to accommodate the inclusion or institution of new decorations and medals, first upon the integration into the South African National Defence Force in 1994 and again upon the institution of a new set of awards in 2003.

South African Defence Force until 26 April 1994

- Official SADF order of precedence:
  - Preceded by the Good Service Medal, Bronze.
  - Succeeded by the Queen's Medal for Champion Shots in the Military Forces of the United Kingdom.
- Official national order of precedence:
  - Preceded by the National Intelligence Service Medal for Faithful Service, Bronze.
  - Succeeded by the State President Sport Award.

South African National Defence Force from 27 April 1994

- Official SANDF order of precedence:
  - Preceded by the Long Service Medal, Bronze of the Republic of Venda.
  - Succeeded by the Faithful Service Medal of the Republic of Transkei.
- Official national order of precedence:
  - Preceded by the Police Medal for Faithful Service of the KwaNdebele Homeland.
  - Succeeded by the Faithful Service Medal of the Republic of Transkei.

The position of the De Wet Medal in the order of precedence remained unchanged, as it was on 27 April 1994, when decorations and medals were belatedly instituted in April 1996 for the two former non-statutory forces, the Azanian People's Liberation Army and Umkhonto we Sizwe, and again when a new series of military decorations and medals was instituted in South Africa on 27 April 2003.

== Description ==
Obverse

The De Wet Medal is a disk struck in bronze, 38 millimetres in diameter and 3 millimetres thick, depicting Second Boer War General Christiaan de Wet on horseback, surrounded by a wreath of proteas and inscribed "MEDALJE ~ DE WET ~ MEDAL".

Reverse

The reverse has the pre-1994 South African Coat of Arms.

Ribbons

The ribbon is 32 millimetres wide, with a 4 millimetres wide green band, a 2 millimetres wide white band and a 7 millimetres wide dark blue band, repeated in reverse order and separated by a 6 millimetres wide yellow band in the centre. The green and yellow colours have their origin in the ribbon colours of the three awards which were belatedly instituted in 1920, as retrospective awards for Boer veteran officers and men of the Second Boer War of 1899–1902, the Dekoratie voor Trouwe Dienst, the Medalje voor de Anglo-Boere Oorlog and the Lint voor Verwonding. For these three awards, these two colours had been gazetted as green and orange, but the orange appeared as yellow on the actual ribbons.

== Discontinuation ==
Conferment of the medal was discontinued in respect of services performed on or after 27 April 2003.
