= Faithful Service Medal (Transkei) =

- Miniature medal in bronze instead of silver
- Type: Military long service medal
- Awarded for: Ten years faithful service
- Country: Transkei
- Presented by: the State President
- Eligibility: All ranks
- Status: Discontinued in 1994
- Established: 1987
- Ribbon bar versions

TDF pre-1994 & SANDF post-2002 orders of wear
- Next (higher): TDF precedence: Military Rule Medal; SANDF precedence: De Wet Medal
- Next (lower): SANDF succession: Medal for Long Service, Bronze

The Faithful Service Medal was instituted by the State President of the Republic of Transkei in 1987, for award to all ranks as a long service medal.

== The Transkei Defence Force ==
The Transkei Defence Force (TDF) was established upon that country's independence on 26 October 1976. The Republic of Transkei ceased to exist on 27 April 1994 and the Transkei Defence Force was amalgamated with six other military forces into the South African National Defence Force (SANDF).

== Institution ==
The Faithful Service Medal was instituted by the State President of Transkei in 1987.

== Award criteria ==
The medal could be awarded to all ranks for ten years of long and faithful service. It is considered as Transkei's approximate equivalent of South Africa's Good Service Medal, Bronze.

== Other versions ==
Silver medal, with ribbon reversed

While only one medal is officially documented as an award for ten years service in the Transkei Defence Force, two versions are known to exist, the one in silver, as presented to recipients of the medal, and also another in bronze.

It is possible that the bronze versions are proof specimens which were never officially accepted or presented, but it is equally possible that an as yet undiscovered third silver-gilt medal also exists. The same official documentation lists long service medals for the Transkei Police and Transkei Prisons for 10, 18, 20, 30 (two versions each) and 35 years service. Since no warrants have yet been traced for several decorations and medals which are known to have been instituted and likely also awarded in Transkei, and since it is unlikely that only the one long service award exists for the Transkei Defence Force while so many exist for the Transkei Police and Transkei Prisons, it can be surmised that, of the two known existing versions of this medal, the bronze was actually intended to recognise ten years faithful service and the silver, twenty years.

== Order of wear ==
Since the Faithful Service Medal was authorised for wear by one of the statutory forces which came to be part of the South African National Defence Force on 27 April 1994, it was accorded a position in the official South African order of precedence on that date.

Transkei Defence Force until 26 April 1994

- Official TDF order of precedence:
  - Preceded by the Military Rule Medal.
- Transkei official national order of precedence:
  - Preceded by the Police Faithful Service Medal, 10 Years.
  - Succeeded by the Prisons Service Medal for Faithful Service, 10 Years.

South African National Defence Force from 27 April 1994

- Official SANDF order of precedence:
  - Preceded by the De Wet Medal of the Republic of South Africa.
  - Succeeded by the Medal for Long Service, Bronze of the Republic of Ciskei.
- Official national order of precedence:
  - Preceded by the De Wet Medal of the Republic of South Africa.
  - Succeeded by the Medal for Long Service, Bronze of the Republic of Ciskei.

The position of the Faithful Service Medal in the order of precedence remained unchanged, as it was on 27 April 1994, when decorations and medals were belatedly instituted in April 1996 for the two former non-statutory forces, the Azanian People's Liberation Army and Umkhonto we Sizwe, and again when a new series of military orders, decorations and medals was instituted in South Africa on 27 April 2003.

== Description ==
Obverse

The Faithful Service Medal is a medallion struck in silver (and bronze), 38 millimetres in diameter and 3 millimetres thick at the rim. The obverse displays the Coat of Arms of the Republic of Transkei.

Reverse

The reverse is inscribed "YENKONZO ETHEMBEKILEYO — • — FOR FAITHFUL SERVICE" in four lines, the inscription surrounded by a laurel wreath.

Ribbons

Bronze medal with third ribbon version

Three different ribbon versions are known.

- The known official ribbon is 32 millimetres wide, with an 11 millimetres wide red band, a 10 millimetres wide sky blue band and an 11 millimetres wide dark blue band.
- The ribbon as authorised, but apparently not actually issued and possibly meant for the silver medal, is 32 millimetres wide with five bands, widths unknown, in navy blue, red, sky blue, red and navy blue.
- A third ribbon, shown with the bronze medal depicted alongside and possibly meant for an as yet undiscovered third medal, possibly silver-gilt, is 32 millimetres wide with seven bands of equal width in brown, white and green, repeated in reverse order and separated by a yellow (gold) band in the centre.

== Discontinuation ==
Conferment of the Faithful Service Medal was discontinued when the Republic of Transkei ceased to exist on 27 April 1994.
