= Ciskei Defence Force =

Armed force of the former Republic of Ciskei Bantustan in South Africa

- Flag of the CDF
- Founded: 1981
- Disbanded: April 1994
- Service branches: One Ciskei Battalion; Two Ciskei Battalion; Air Wing
- Headquarters: Jong'umsobomvu (outside King Williams Town)

Leadership
- Commander-in-Chief: Brigadier General Oupa Gqozo

Personnel
- Military age: 18–49
- Deployed personnel: 2,000 (1993)

Expenditure
- Budget: R99,910,000

Related articles
- History: Military history of South Africa
- Ranks: Military ranks of Ciskei

The Ciskei Defence Force (CDF) was established during March 1981 from the 141 Battalion of the South African Defence Force (SADF). It was the defence force of Ciskei, a bantustan that was controlled by the apartheid regime of South Africa. The CDF functioned as part of the 21 Battalion based near Lenasia, outside Johannesburg.

== Overview ==
In 1993 the total troop count of the CDF was 2,000. The defence expenditure for Ciskei for 1991/2 was R76,883,000 and for the period of 1993/94 it was R99,910,000.

== Organisation and structure ==
According to Jakkie Cilliers, the CDF consisted of the following:

=== Headquarters ===
Originally located at Jong'umsobomvu (outside King William's Town), however, in 1993 the CDF's headquarters moved to the Parliament Buildings in Bhisho. Jong'umsobomvu retained the following:

- Logistic Depot: including general equipment, uniforms, daily maintenance, rations, fuel, etc.
- Maintenance and Construction Unit
- Training Centre.

=== One Ciskei Battalion ===
The battalion consisted of 900 men and were stationed at Bhisho; it consisted of:

- 3 companies of which 2 had Mamba mine-protected vehicles
- a small support company
- a large Light Workshop Troop and signals workshops which served the whole of the CDF

=== Two Ciskei Battalion ===
The battalion consisted of 700 men and was stationed at Keiskammahoek; it consisted of:

- 3 companies with Mamba mine-protected vehicles
- a small support company.

=== Air Wing ===
Situated at Bisho Airport a.k.a. Bulembu; it consisted of:

- two Short SC.7 Skyvan light transport aircraft for paratroopers and general air transport
- three MBB/Kawasaki BK 117 helicopters
- three Cessna 150 light fixed wing aircraft for communication flights, etc
- two Britten-Norman BN-2 Islanders for personnel and freight transport
- Piper J-3 Cub

There was a special forces/parachute company stationed at Bulembu, the core of a possible future parachute regiment. The Ciskei military band was also stationed at Bulembo and fell under the Air Wing for administrative purposes.

=== Auxiliary ===
The CDF's auxiliary according to Jakkie Cilliers consisted of, quote:

"The CDF had semi-permanent company bases at Alice and Kama/Whittlesea. There are also Auxiliary Services for which the CDF provided training and certain administrative functions. These Services are tasked with the protection of chiefs and headmen. These forces are controlled by structures within the Council of State. There is also a decentralised medical and signals element.

== Ranks ==
Officers

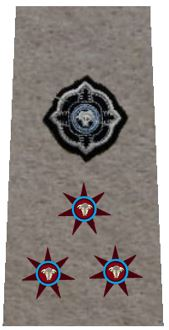
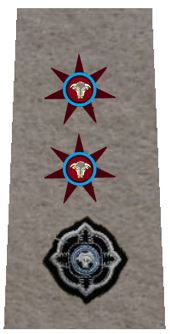
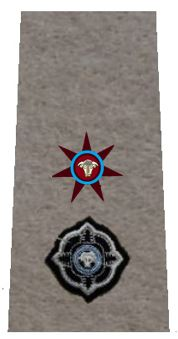
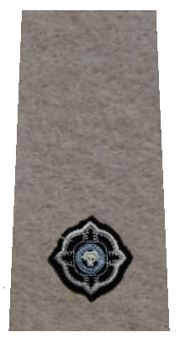
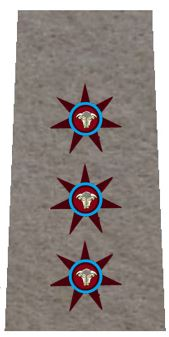
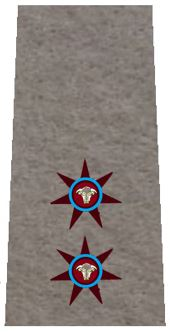
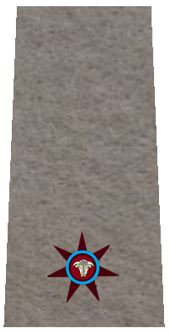
Rank group	General / flag officers		Senior officers			Junior officers
Ciskei Army
Ciskei Army	Lieutenant general	Brigadier	Colonel	Lieutenant colonel	Major	Captain	Lieutenant	Second lieutenant

Other

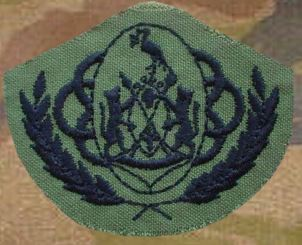
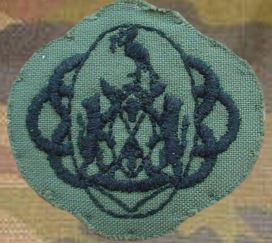
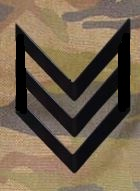
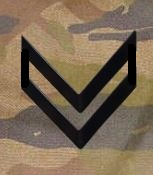
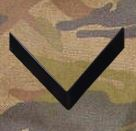
Rank group	Senior NCOs				Junior NCOs		Enlisted
Ciskei Army							No insignia
Ciskei Army	Chief warrant officer	Warrant officer	Staff sergeant	Sergeant	Corporal	Lance corporal	Private

== Equipment ==
The CDF was equipped for counter-insurgency (COIN) operations. The CDF had one 25 pounder field gun for ceremonial purposes and used R4/R5 assault rifles. The 7,62 mm Light Machine Gun issued was the SS-77. Other armaments included the 40 mm Multiple Grenade Launcher, 60 mm and 81 mm mortars and 7,62 mm Browning.

Vehicles included Mambas, Buffels, Samil 20, seven ton Isuzu trucks and 4x4 vehicles."

== Insignia ==
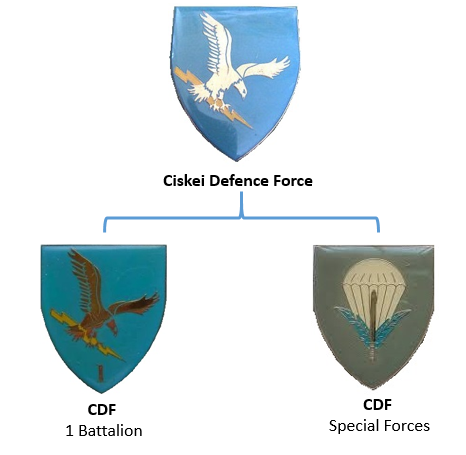
Ciskei Defence Force insignia

== Medals ==
These were the medals awarded by the Ciskei authorities, primarily to members of the CDF:

- Chief C.D.F. Commendation Medal (Ciskei)
- Ciskei Defence Medal (Note: Introduced in 1988) (Ciskei)
- Independence Medal (Note: Introduced in 1981) (Ciskei)
- Medal for Long Service (Bronze) (Ciskei)
- President's Medal for Shooting (Ciskei)
- Sandile Decoration (SD) (Ciskei)
- Sandile Medal (Ciskei)

== Disbandment ==
With the end of Apartheid in 1994 in South Africa, the former defence forces of the Bantustans were incorporated into the newly formed South African National Defence Force.

== Flag ==
The Flag of Ciskei was located in the canton on a green background. On the green a large golden eagle clasped a lightning bolt.
