= Tshumelo Ikatelaho =

South African military service award

Tshumelo Ikatelaho General Service Medal
- Type: Military campaign medal
- Awarded for: Participation in military campaigns or operations
- Country: South Africa
- Presented by: the President
- Eligibility: All ranks
- Clasps: PEACE SUPPORT; HUMANITARIAN AID; FORCE INTERVENTION BRIGADE
- Status: Current
- Established: 27 April 2003
- Ribbon bar

Order of wear
- Next (higher): South Africa Service Medal
- Next (lower): Queen Elizabeth II Coronation Medal

The Tshumelo Ikatelaho - General Service Medal was instituted by the President of the Republic of South Africa on 16 April 2003, and came into effect on 27 April 2003. It can be awarded to all ranks who have participated in military campaigns or operations which, while not warranting the institution of particular campaign medals, still justify the award of a medal for general service. The bilingual title of the medal is in Tshivenda and English.

== The South African military ==
The Union Defence Force (UDF) was established in 1912 and renamed the South African Defence Force (SADF) in 1958. On 27 April 1994, it was integrated with six other independent forces into the South African National Defence Force (SANDF).

== Award criteria ==
The medal can be awarded to all ranks of the South African National Defence Force, Auxiliary Service of the South African National Defence Force, and Armed Forces attached to or serving with or rendering any service to the South African National Defence Force who, for one day or more, have participated directly in or in support of military campaigns or operations, belligerent or otherwise, in accordance with the provisions of the Defence Act, which operations in themselves may not warrant the institution of particular campaign medals but which are nevertheless judged to be of sufficient significance to justify the award of a medal for general service.

The medal may be awarded posthumously. A member who is injured, killed, or dies before completing the required period of duty is deemed to have rendered the qualifying service for awarding of the medal or a clasp. The period of qualifying service for official visits or inspections in connection with an operation is a minimum of 34 days, which may be continuous or interrupted.

Guidelines consisting of appropriate phrases which may be useful when writing a citation for the award of the Tshumelo Ikatelaho - General Service Medal have been published by the South African Defence Department.

== Clasps ==

Clasps may be awarded to indicate a particular campaign or operation for which the medal has been conferred. The three clasps which have been instituted to date are the Peace Support Clasp, Humanitarian Aid Clasp, and Force Intervention Brigade Clasp.

== Mentioned in Dispatches - Okhankanyiweyo ==
Okhankanyiweyo

The Mentioned in Dispatches - Okhankanyiweyo emblem was instituted by the President on 16 April 2003 and came into effect on 27 April 2003. The bilingual title of the honour is in English and isiNdebele. Members of all ranks whose names have been mentioned in dispatches to the President for having distinguished themselves in the execution of duty for actions of bravery or meritorious conduct, leadership, service, or devotion to duty, which may not warrant the award of a particular decoration or medal, are awarded a miniature emblem in the form of the coat of arms of the Republic of South Africa.

The Mentioned in Dispatches - Okhankanyiweyo emblem is worn above any campaign clasp on the ribbon of the relevant campaign medal, or on the ribbon of the Tshumelo Ikatelaho - General Service Medal or, if the recipient has no such medal, in the position of a single ribbon on a ribbon bar after all other honours worn by the recipient.

== Order of wear ==
The position of the Tshumelo Ikatelaho - General Service Medal in the official military and national orders of precedence is as follows:

Official military order of precedence

- Preceded by the South Africa Service Medal of Umkhonto we Sizwe and the Azanian People's Liberation Army.
- Succeeded by the Queen Elizabeth II Coronation Medal of the United Kingdom.

Official national order of precedence

- Preceded by the South Africa Service Medal of Umkhonto we Sizwe and the Azanian People's Liberation Army.
- Succeeded by the Queen Elizabeth II Coronation Medal of the United Kingdom.

== Description ==
Front

The Tshumelo Ikatelaho - General Service Medal is a bronze, octagonal medal, 38 millimetres in diameter, with a faceted nine-pointed star charged within a laurel wreath. The star represents the nine Provinces of the Republic of South Africa.

Reverse

The reverse bears, in relief, the coat of arms of the Republic of South Africa. The medal is attached to a plain nickel-silver suspender fixed to the upper rim of the medal. The medal number is stamped below the coat of arms.

Ribbon

The ribbon is 32 millimetres wide, with a 5 millimetre wide national flag blue band, a 2 millimetre wide white band, a 6 millimetre wide national flag red band, and a 1½ millimetre wide gold band, repeated in reverse order and separated by a 3 millimetre wide black band in the centre.

Clasps

Clasps are 33 millimetres wide and 5 millimetres high, struck in bronze, and embossed with a name, date, description, or device to indicate a particular campaign or operation. On the ribbon, the clasps are read from the bottom up in order of award. To date, three clasps have been instituted, inscribed "PEACE SUPPORT", "HUMANITARIAN AID", and "FORCE INTERVENTION BRIGADE" respectively.

Mentioned in Dispatches - Okhankanyiweyo

Okhankanyiweyo

The Mentioned in Dispatches - Okhankanyiweyo emblem is in the form of the coat of arms of the Republic of South Africa, struck in bronze and 16 millimetres in height. When only a ribbon bar is worn a miniature emblem, 8 millimetres in height, is affixed in the centre of the relevant ribbon bar. When the emblem is worn with miniature medals the same miniature emblem is worn above any campaign clasp.
