= Medal for Distinguished Conduct and Loyal Service =

- Type: Military long service medal
- Awarded for: Forty years of loyal service and distinguished conduct
- Country: South Africa
- Presented by: the State President and, from 1994, the President
- Eligibility: All ranks
- Status: Discontinued in 2003
- Established: 1987
- First award: 1991
- Original, Version 2 and 1994-2003 ribbon bars

SADF pre-1994 & SANDF post-2002 orders of wear
- Next (higher): SADF precedence: Queen Elizabeth II Coronation Medal; SANDF precedence: Medalje vir Troue Diens and Bar, 50 years
- Next (lower): SADF succession: Good Service Medal, Gold; SANDF succession: Medalje vir Troue Diens and Bar, 40 years

The Medal for Distinguished Conduct and Loyal Service is a South African military medal which was instituted by the Republic in 1987. It was awarded to members of the South African Defence Force for forty years of loyal service and distinguished conduct.

== The South African military ==
The Union Defence Forces (UDF) were established in 1912 and renamed the South African Defence Force (SADF) in 1958. On 27 April 1994, it was integrated with six other independent forces into the South African National Defence Force (SANDF).

== Institution ==
The Medal for Distinguished Conduct and Loyal Service was instituted by the State President in 1987.

== Award criteria ==
The medal could be awarded to Permanent Force, Citizen Force and Commando members of the South African Defence Force for forty years of loyal service and distinguished conduct.

== Order of wear ==
The position of the Medal for Distinguished Conduct and Loyal Service in the official order of precedence was revised twice, to accommodate the inclusion or institution of new decorations and medals, first upon the integration into the South African National Defence Force in 1994 and again upon the institution of a new set of awards in 2003.

South African Defence Force until 26 April 1994

- Official SADF order of precedence:
  - Preceded by the Queen Elizabeth II Coronation Medal of the United Kingdom.
  - Succeeded by the Good Service Medal, Gold.
- Official national order of precedence:
  - Preceded by the Police Seventy-Fifth Anniversary Commemorative Medal.
  - Succeeded by the Police Star for Merit.

South African National Defence Force from 27 April 1994

- Official SANDF order of precedence:
  - Preceded by the Unitas Medal of the Republic of South Africa.
  - Succeeded by the Good Service Medal, Gold of the Republic of South Africa.
- Official national order of precedence:
  - Preceded by the Police Service Amalgamation Medal of the Republic of South Africa.
  - Succeeded by the Police Faithful Service Medal of the Republic of Transkei.

South African National Defence Force from 27 April 2003

- Official SANDF order of precedence:
  - Preceded by the Medalje vir Troue Diens and Bar, 50 years of the Republic of South Africa.
  - Succeeded by the Medalje vir Troue Diens and Bar, 40 years of the Republic of South Africa.
- Official national order of precedence:
  - Preceded by the Medalje vir Troue Diens and Bar, 50 years of the Republic of South Africa.
  - Succeeded by the Medalje vir Troue Diens and Bar, 40 years of the Republic of South Africa.

== Description ==
Obverse

The Medal for Distinguished Conduct and Loyal Service is a medallion, struck in 9 carat gold, 38 millimetres in diameter and 3 millimetres thick at the centre, depicting the pre-1994 South African Coat of Arms.

Reverse

The reverse has the Roman numeral "XL", surrounded by a wreath of leaves, with the medal number stamped or engraved above.

Ribbons

The original ribbon was 32 millimetres wide and green, with a single multicoloured band in the centre consisting of a 1 millimetre wide white band, three bands in orange, white and blue, all three 4 millimetres wide, and a 1 millimetre wide white band. Orange, white and blue are the colours of the pre-1994 national flag.

A second version exists, with the orange and blue bands now both 4 millimetres wide and all three white bands 2 millimetres wide. These ribbons were replaced when the new national flag was instituted.

The new ribbon was also 32 millimetres wide and green, with a single multicoloured band in the centre consisting of red, white, black, yellow and blue bands, all five bands 2 millimetres wide. Green, red, white, black, yellow and blue are the colours of the post-1994 South African national flag.

== Discontinuation ==
Conferment of the medal was discontinued in respect of services performed on or after 27 April 2003.
