= Medalje vir Troue Diens =

Medalje vir Troue Diens Medal for Loyal Service
- Type: Military long service medal
- Awarded for: Ten years of loyal service
- Country: South Africa
- Presented by: the President
- Eligibility: All ranks
- Status: Current
- Established: 27 April 2003
- Ribbon bar

Order of wear
- Next (higher): Service Medal in Bronze
- Next (lower): Queen's Medal for Champion Shots in the Military Forces

The Medalje vir Troue Diens - Medal for Loyal Service was instituted by the President of the Republic of South Africa on 16 April 2003 and came into effect on 27 April 2003. It can be awarded to all ranks whose character and conduct have been irreproachable and who have completed ten years of qualifying service.

== The South African military ==
The Union Defence Forces (UDF) were established in 1912 and renamed the South African Defence Force (SADF) in 1958. On 27 April 1994, it was integrated with six other independent forces into the South African National Defence Force (SANDF).

== Institution ==
The Medalje vir Troue Diens - Medal for Loyal Service was instituted by the President on 16 April 2003 and came into effect on 27 April 2003. The bilingual title of the medal is in Afrikaans and English.

== Award criteria ==
The medal can be awarded to all ranks of the South African National Defence Force and of any Auxiliary Service of the South African National Defence Force, whose character and conduct have been irreproachable and who, on or after 27 April 2003, have completed ten years of qualifying service, not necessarily continuous. The medal and the Bars to the medal may be awarded posthumously. Qualifying service include service in the former constituent permanent or part-time forces of the SANDF as well as other former uniformed establishments, such as the Police forces and Prisons services of South Africa, the Republics of Transkei, Bophuthatswana, Venda and Ciskei and the Self-Governing Territories.

Upon completion of further periods of ten years of qualifying service, the Medalje vir Troue Diens - Medal for Loyal Service and the appropriate bar may be awarded in addition to previous medals for long service which had been awarded for service in these former forces.

Guidelines, consisting of appropriate words or phrases which may be useful when writing a citation for the award of the Medalje vir Troue Diens - Medal for Loyal Service, have been published by the South African Defence Department.

== Orders of wear ==
Only one medal is conferred and, for each additional period of ten years of qualifying service to a maximum of another forty years, altogether four bars may be awarded to denote subsequent conferments of the medal. The position of the Medalje vir Troue Diens - Medal for Loyal Service in the official military and national orders of precedence depends on which bars for further periods of service beyond ten years, if any, had been awarded to the recipient.

=== Medalje vir Troue Diens - Medal for Loyal Service ===
In respect of the Medalje vir Troue Diens without a bar, for ten years service, the official order of precedence is as follows:

Official military order of precedence

- Preceded by the Service Medal in Bronze of Umkhonto we Sizwe.
- Succeeded by the Queen's Medal for Champion Shots in the Military Forces of the United Kingdom.

Official national order of precedence

- Preceded by the Service Medal in Bronze of Umkhonto we Sizwe.
- Succeeded by the Queen's Medal for Champion Shots in the Military Forces of the United Kingdom.

=== Medalje vir Troue Diens and Bar, 20 years ===

In respect of the Medalje vir Troue Diens and Bar for twenty years service, the official order of precedence is as follows:

Official military order of precedence

- Preceded by the Silver Service Medal of the Azanian People's Liberation Army.
- Succeeded by the Union Medal of the Union of South Africa.

Official national order of precedence

- Preceded by the Silver Service Medal of the Azanian People's Liberation Army.
- Succeeded by the Medal for Faithful Service in the Prisons Service of the Republic of South Africa.

=== Medalje vir Troue Diens and Bar, 30 years ===
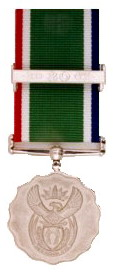

In respect of the Medalje vir Troue Diens and Bar for thirty years service, the official order of precedence is as follows:

Official military order of precedence

- Preceded by the Service Medal in Gold of Umkhonto we Sizwe.
- Succeeded by the John Chard Decoration (JCD) of the Republic of South Africa.

Official national order of precedence

- Preceded by the Service Medal in Gold of Umkhonto we Sizwe.
- Succeeded by the John Chard Decoration (JCD) of the Republic of South Africa.

=== Medalje vir Troue Diens and Bar, 40 years ===
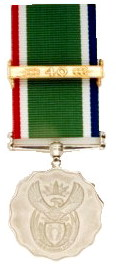

In respect of the Medalje vir Troue Diens and Bar for forty years service, the official order of precedence is as follows:

Official military order of precedence

- Preceded by the Medal for Distinguished Conduct and Loyal Service of the Republic of South Africa.
- Succeeded by the Good Service Medal, Gold of the Republic of South Africa.

Official national order of precedence

- Preceded by the Medal for Distinguished Conduct and Loyal Service of the Republic of South Africa.
- Succeeded by the Police Faithful Service Medal, 35 Years of the Republic of Transkei.

=== Medalje vir Troue Diens and Bar, 50 years ===
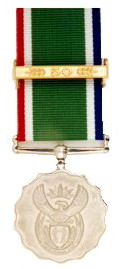

In respect of the Medalje vir Troue Diens and Bar for fifty years service, the official order of precedence is as follows:

Official military order of precedence

- Preceded by the Closure Commemoration Medal of the Republic of South Africa.
- Succeeded by the Medal for Distinguished Conduct and Loyal Service of the Republic of South Africa.

Official national order of precedence

- Preceded by the Police Service Amalgamation Medal of the Republic of South Africa.
- Succeeded by the Medal for Distinguished Conduct and Loyal Service of the Republic of South Africa.

== Emblem for Reserve Force Service ==
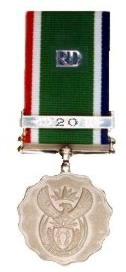

The Emblem for Reserve Force Service, post-nominal letters RD, was instituted on 27 April 2003 and may be awarded to members in the part-time Reserves of the South African National Defence Force who have performed twenty years of loyal service, of which not less than five years were served in the Reserve Force, service in the former Citizen Force or Commandos included. The emblem is worn on the centre of the ribbon of the Medalje vir Troue Diens - Medal for Loyal Service, above any bars awarded for periods of extended service, and may be continued to be worn even if the recipient is later appointed in the Regular Force.

The conferring of the Emblem for Reserve Force Service entitles recipients to the use of the post-nominal letters RD, denoting "Reserve Distinction".

== Description ==
Obverse

The Medalje vir Troue Diens - Medal for Loyal Service was struck in nickel-silver, circular in shape with a diameter of 38 millimetres and a raised edge, with the edge evenly scalloped. The obverse of the medal bears the coat of arms of the Republic of South Africa in relief.

Reverse

The reverse bears the emblem of the South African National Defence Force at the top and is inscribed, in relief, with the words "VIR TROUE DIENS" around the lower perimeter, with the medal number impressed between the emblem and the inscription. The medal is attached to a plain nickel-silver suspender affixed to the upper rim of the medal.

Ribbon

The ribbon is 32 millimetres wide and national flag green, with a 3 millimetres wide national flag red band and a 3 millimetres wide white band on the left edge, and a 3 millimetres wide white band and a 3 millimetres wide national flag blue band on the right edge.

Bars

The bars are 33 millimetres wide and 5 millimetres high, with the Arabic numerals "20", "30", "40" or "50" respectively in relief in the centre. When only a ribbon bar is worn, silhouette button replicas of the medal, 8 millimetres in diameter and with the Arabic numerals "20", "30", "40" or "50" respectively in relief, is affixed to the ribbon bar to denote each bar awarded, evenly spaced on the breadth of the ribbon. The bars and ribbon buttons are struck in the following metals:

- Silver for the completion of twenty years of service.
- Matt silver for the completion of thirty years of service.
- Silver-gilt for the completion of forty years of service.
- Matt silver-gilt for the completion of fifty years of service.

Emblem for Reserve Force Service

The Emblem for Reserve Force Service consists of the uppercase letters "RD", 8 millimetres high and struck in silver.
