= Service Medal in Gold =

- Type: Military long service medal
- Awarded for: Thirty years exemplary service
- Country: South Africa
- Presented by: the President
- Eligibility: Umkhonto we Sizwe cadres
- Campaign: The "struggle"
- Status: Discontinued in 2003
- Established: 1996
- Ribbon bar

MK 1996 & SANDF post-2002 orders of wear
- Next (higher): MK precedence: South Africa Service Medal; SANDF precedence: Gold Service Medal
- Next (lower): MK succession: Service Medal in Silver; SANDF succession: Medalje vir Troue Diens and Bar, 30 years

The Service Medal in Gold was instituted by the President of the Republic of South Africa in April 1996. It was awarded to veteran cadres of Umkhonto we Sizwe, the military wing of the African National Congress, for thirty years exemplary service.

== Umkhonto we Sizwe ==
Umkhonto we Sizwe, abbreviated as MK, "Spear of the Nation" in Xhosa, was the para-military wing of the African National Congress (ANC). It was established on 16 December 1961 to wage an armed "struggle" against the Nationalist government inside South Africa. On 27 April 1994, Umkhonto we Sizwe was amalgamated with six other military forces into the South African National Defence Force (SANDF).

== Institution ==
The Service Medal in Gold was instituted by the President of South Africa in April 1996. It is the senior award of a set of three medals for long service, along with the Service Medal in Silver and the Service Medal in Bronze.

Umkhonto we Sizwe's military decorations and medals were modelled on those of the South African Defence Force and these three medals are the approximate equivalents of, respectively, the Good Service Medal, Gold, the Good Service Medal, Silver and the Good Service Medal, Bronze.

== Award criteria ==
The medal could be awarded to veteran cadres of Umkhonto we Sizwe for thirty years exemplary service.

== Order of wear ==
The position of the Service Medal in Gold in the official military and national orders of precedence was revised upon the institution of a new set of honours on 27 April 2003.

Umkhonto we Sizwe

- Official MK order of precedence:
  - Preceded by the South Africa Service Medal.
  - Succeeded by the Service Medal in Silver.

South African National Defence Force until 26 April 2003

- Official SANDF order of precedence:
  - Preceded by the Gold Service Medal of the Azanian People's Liberation Army.
  - Succeeded by the John Chard Decoration (JCD) of the Republic of South Africa.
- Official national order of precedence:
  - Preceded by the Gold Service Medal of the Azanian People's Liberation Army.
  - Succeeded by the John Chard Decoration (JCD) of the Republic of South Africa.

South African National Defence Force from 27 April 2003

- Official SANDF order of precedence:
  - Preceded by the Gold Service Medal of the Azanian People's Liberation Army.
  - Succeeded by the Medalje vir Troue Diens and Bar, 30 years of the Republic of South Africa.
- Official national order of precedence:
  - Preceded by the Gold Service Medal of the Azanian People's Liberation Army.
  - Succeeded by the Medalje vir Troue Diens and Bar, 30 years of the Republic of South Africa.

== Description ==
Obverse

The Service Medal in Gold is a silver-gilt oval medallion with a raised edge, depicting the Umkhonto we Sizwe emblem.

Reverse

The reverse is smooth and displays the embellished pre-1994 South African Coat of Arms, with silver hallmarks impressed below and the medal number impressed above.

Ribbon

The ribbon is 32 millimetres wide and green, with a 4 millimetres wide black edge at left and a 4 millimetres wide yellow edge at right.

== Discontinuation ==
Conferment of the Service Medal in Gold was discontinued upon the institution of a new set of honours on 27 April 2003.
