= Service Medal in Silver =

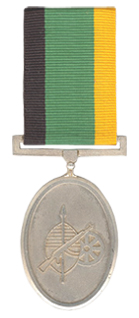
- Type: Military long service medal
- Awarded for: Twenty years service
- Country: South Africa
- Presented by: the President of the RSA
- Eligibility: Umkhonto we Sizwe cadres
- Campaign: The "struggle"
- Status: Discontinued in 2003
- Established: 1996
- Ribbon bar

MK 1996 & SANDF post-2002 orders of wear
- Next (higher): MK precedence: Service Medal in Gold; SANDF precedence: Long Service Medal, Silver
- Next (lower): MK succession: Service Medal in Bronze; SANDF succession: Silver Service Medal

The Service Medal in Silver was instituted by the President of the Republic of South Africa in April 1996. It was awarded to veteran cadres of Umkhonto we Sizwe, the military wing of the African National Congress, for twenty years service.

== Umkhonto we Sizwe ==
Umkhonto we Sizwe, abbreviated as MK, "Spear of the Nation" in Zulu, was the para-military wing of the African National Congress (ANC). It was established on 16 December 1961 to wage an armed "struggle" against the Nationalist government inside South Africa. On 27 April 1994, Umkhonto we Sizwe was amalgamated with six other military forces into the South African National Defence Force (SANDF).

== Institution ==
The Service Medal in Silver was instituted by the President of South Africa in April 1996. It is the middle award of a set of three medals for long service, along with the Service Medal in Gold and the Service Medal in Bronze.

Umkhonto we Sizwe's military decorations and medals were modelled on those of the South African Defence Force and these three medals are the approximate equivalents of, respectively, the Good Service Medal, Gold, the Good Service Medal, Silver and the Good Service Medal, Bronze.

== Award criteria ==
The medal could be awarded to veteran cadres of Umkhonto we Sizwe for twenty years service.

== Order of wear ==
The position of the Service Medal in Silver in the official military and national orders of precedence was revised upon the institution of a new set of honours on 27 April 2003, but it remained unchanged.

Umkhonto we Sizwe

- Official MK order of precedence:
  - Preceded by the Service Medal in Gold.
  - Succeeded by the Service Medal in Bronze.

South African National Defence Force until 26 April 2003

- Official SANDF order of precedence:
  - Preceded by the Long Service Medal, Silver of the Republic of Venda.
  - Succeeded by the Silver Service Medal of the Azanian People's Liberation Army.
- Official national order of precedence:
  - Preceded by the Police Medal for Merit of the QwaQwa Homeland.
  - Succeeded by the Silver Service Medal of the Azanian People's Liberation Army.

== Description ==
Obverse

The Service Medal in Silver is an oval medallion with a raised edge, struck in silver and depicting the Umkhonto we Sizwe emblem.

Reverse

The reverse is smooth and displays the embellished pre-1994 South African Coat of Arms with watermarks impressed below and the medal number impressed above.

Ribbon

The ribbon is 32 millimetres wide and green, with an 8 millimetres wide black edge at left and an 8 millimetres wide yellow edge at right.

== Discontinuation ==
Conferment of the Service Medal in Silver was discontinued upon the institution of a new set of honours on 27 April 2003.
