= Service Medal in Bronze =

- Type: Military long service medal
- Awarded for: Ten years service
- Country: South Africa
- Presented by: the President of the RSA
- Eligibility: uMkhonto we Sizwe cadres
- Campaign: Armed resistance against Apartheid
- Status: Discontinued in 2003
- Established: 1996
- Ribbon bar

MK 1996 & SANDF post-2002 orders of wear
- Next (higher): MK precedence: Service Medal in Silver; SANDF precedence: Bronze Service Medal
- Next (lower): SANDF succession: Medalje vir Troue Diens

The Service Medal in Bronze was instituted by the President of the Republic of South Africa in April 1996. It was awarded to veteran cadres of Umkhonto we Sizwe, the military wing of the African National Congress, for ten years service.

== uMkhonto we Sizwe ==
uMkhonto we Sizwe, abbreviated as MK, "Spear of the Nation" in Zulu, was the paramilitary wing of the African National Congress (ANC). It was established on 16 December 1961 to wage an armed "struggle" against the Nationalist government. On 27 April 1994, uMkhonto we Sizwe was amalgamated with six other military forces into the South African National Defence Force (SANDF).

== Institution ==
The Service Medal in Bronze was instituted by the President of South Africa in April 1996. It is the junior award of a set of three medals for long service, along with the Service Medal in Gold and the Service Medal in Silver.

uMkhonto we Sizwe's military decorations and medals were modelled on those of the South African Defence Force and these three medals are the approximate equivalents of, respectively, the Good Service Medal, Gold, the Good Service Medal, Silver and the Good Service Medal, Bronze.

== Award criteria ==
The medal was authorised for awarding to veteran cadres of uMkhonto we Sizwe for ten years service.

== Order of wear ==
The position of the Service Medal in Bronze in the official military and national orders of precedence was revised upon the institution of a new set of honours on 27 April 2003.

=== uMkhonto we Sizwe ===

- Official MK order of precedence:
  - Preceded by the Service Medal in Silver.

=== South African National Defence Force until 26 April 2003 ===

- Official SANDF order of precedence:
  - Preceded by the Bronze Service Medal of the Azanian People's Liberation Army.
  - Succeeded by the Queen's Medal for Champion Shots in the Military Forces of the United Kingdom.
- Official national order of precedence:
  - Preceded by the Bronze Service Medal of the Azanian People's Liberation Army.
  - Succeeded by the State President's Sport Award of the Republic of South Africa.

=== South African National Defence Force from 27 April 2003 ===

- Official SANDF order of precedence:
  - Preceded by the Bronze Service Medal of the Azanian People's Liberation Army.
  - Succeeded by the Medalje vir Troue Diens of the Republic of South Africa.
- Official national order of precedence:
  - Preceded by the Bronze Service Medal of the Azanian People's Liberation Army.
  - Succeeded by the Medalje vir Troue Diens of the Republic of South Africa.

== Description ==
=== Obverse ===
The Service Medal in Bronze is an oval medallion with a raised edge, struck in bronze and depicting the Umkhonto we Sizwe emblem.

=== Reverse ===
The reverse is smooth and displays the embellished pre-1994 South African Coat of Arms.

=== Ribbon ===
The ribbon is 32 millimetres wide, with a 10 millimetres wide black band, a 12 millimetres wide green band and a 10 millimetres wide yellow band.

== Discontinuation ==
Conferment of the Service Medal in Bronze was discontinued upon the institution of a new set of honours on 27 April 2003.
