= Chief of Staff Logistics =

Senior position in the SANDF

Chief of Staff Logistics is a senior position within the South African National Defence Force, responsible for all Logistical requirement of the Defence Force.

The post was created on 15 April 1974 following a 1972 review of the Defence Force. The first Chief of Staff Logistics was Lieutenant General H P Laubscher.
