= South Africa Service Medal =

- Type: Military campaign medal
- Awarded for: Operational service inside South Africa
- Country: South Africa
- Presented by: the President
- Eligibility: Umkhonto we Sizwe and Azanian People's Liberation Army cadres
- Campaign: The "struggle"
- Status: Discontinued in 2003
- Established: 1998
- Ribbon bar

APLA and MK 1996 & SANDF post-2002 orders of wear
- Next (higher): MK and APLA precedence: Operational Medal for Southern Africa; SANDF precedence: Operational Medal for Southern Africa
- Next (lower): MK succession: Service Medal in Gold; APLA succession: Gold Service Medal; SANDF succession: Tshumelo Ikatelaho

The South Africa Service Medal was instituted by the President of the Republic of South Africa in 1998. It was awarded to veteran cadres of Umkhonto we Sizwe and the Azanian People's Liberation Army for operational service inside South Africa during the "struggle".

== MK and APLA ==
Umkhonto we Sizwe, abbreviated as MK, "Spear of the Nation" in Zulu, was the para-military wing of the African National Congress (ANC), while the Azanian People's Liberation Army (APLA) was the para-military wing of the Pan Africanist Congress. Both were established in 1961 to wage an armed "struggle" against the Nationalist government inside South Africa. On 27 April 1994, Umkhonto we Sizwe and the Azanian People's Liberation Army were amalgamated with five statutory defence forces into the South African National Defence Force (SANDF).

== Institution ==
The South Africa Service Medal was instituted by the President of South Africa in April 1998.

== Award criteria ==
The medal could be awarded to veteran cadres of Umkhonto we Sizwe and the Azanian People's Liberation Army for operational service inside South Africa during the "struggle".

== Order of wear ==
The position of the South Africa Service Medal in the official military and national orders of precedence was revised upon the institution of a new set of honours on 27 April 2003.

Umkhonto we Sizwe

- Official MK order of precedence:
  - Preceded by the Operational Medal for Southern Africa.
  - Succeeded by the Service Medal in Gold.

Azanian People's Liberation Army

- Official APLA order of precedence:
  - Preceded by the Operational Medal for Southern Africa.
  - Succeeded by the Gold Service Medal.

South African National Defence Force until 26 April 2003

- Official SANDF order of precedence:
  - Preceded by the Operational Medal for Southern Africa of Umkhonto we Sizwe and the Azanian People's Liberation Army.
  - Succeeded by the Queen Elizabeth II Coronation Medal of the United Kingdom.
- Official national order of precedence:
  - Preceded by the Operational Medal for Southern Africa of Umkhonto we Sizwe and the Azanian People's Liberation Army.
  - Succeeded by the Queen Elizabeth II Coronation Medal of the United Kingdom.

South African National Defence Force from 27 April 2003

- Official SANDF order of precedence:
  - Preceded by the Operational Medal for Southern Africa of Umkhonto we Sizwe and the Azanian People's Liberation Army.
  - Succeeded by the Tshumelo Ikatelaho of the Republic of South Africa.
- Official national order of precedence:
  - Preceded by the Operational Medal for Southern Africa of Umkhonto we Sizwe and the Azanian People's Liberation Army.
  - Succeeded by the Tshumelo Ikatelaho of the Republic of South Africa.

== Description ==
Obverse

The South Africa Service Medal is a medallion struck in nickel-silver, 38 millimetres in diameter with a raised rim, and depicts a crossed knobkierie and spear on an African shield above a map of South Africa.

Reverse

The reverse has a raised rim and displays the embellished pre-1994 South African Coat of Arms.

Ribbon

The ribbon is 32 millimetres wide, with a 4 millimetres wide blue band, an 8 millimetres wide yellow band and a 1 millimetre wide white band, repeated in reverse order and separated by a 6 millimetres wide red band in the centre.

== Discontinuation ==
Conferment of the South Africa Service Medal was discontinued upon the institution of a new set of honours on 27 April 2003.
