= Good Service Medal, Bronze =

- Type: Military long service medal
- Awarded for: 10 years of good service
- Country: → South Africa
- Presented by: the State President and, from 1994, the President
- Eligibility: All ranks
- Status: Discontinued in 2003
- Established: 1975
- Original PF, CF and Commando ribbon bars Ribbon bar from 1993

SADF pre-1994 & SANDF post-2002 orders of wear
- Next (higher): SADF precedence: John Chard Medal; SANDF precedence: John Chard Medal
- Next (lower): SADF succession: De Wet Medal; SANDF succession: Medal for Long Service and Good Conduct, Bronze

The Good Service Medal, Bronze, originally named the South African Defence Force Good Service Medal, Bronze, is the junior of a set of three South African military medals which was instituted by the Republic on 1 July 1975. It was awarded to members of all elements of the South African Defence Force for ten years of exemplary service, but was restricted to Permanent Force personnel from 1993.

== The South African military ==
The Union Defence Forces (UDF) were established in 1912 and renamed the South African Defence Force (SADF) in 1958. On 27 April 1994, it was integrated with six other independent forces into the South African National Defence Force (SANDF).

== Institution ==
The Good Service Medal, Bronze was instituted by the State President in 1975 and, until 1993, was named the South African Defence Force Good Service Medal, Bronze. The medal is the junior of a set of three military medals for good service, along with the Good Service Medal, Gold for thirty years of good service and the Good Service Medal, Silver for twenty.

== Award criteria ==
The medal was initially awarded to Permanent Force, Citizen Force and Commando members of the South African Defence Force for ten years of good service, but was restricted to Permanent Force personnel from 1993 and renamed.

== Order of wear ==
The position of the Good Service Medal, Bronze in the official order of precedence was revised three times to accommodate the inclusion or institution of new decorations and medals, first upon the integration into the South African National Defence Force on 27 April 1994, again when decorations and medals were belatedly instituted in April 1996 for the two former non-statutory forces, the Azanian People's Liberation Army and Umkhonto we Sizwe, and again when a new series of military decorations and medals was instituted in South Africa on 27 April 2003. Its position remained unchanged, as it was on 27 April 1994, upon the latter two occasions.

South African Defence Force until 26 April 1994

- Official SADF order of precedence:
  - Preceded by the John Chard Medal.
  - Succeeded by the De Wet Medal.
- Official national order of precedence:
  - Preceded by the South African Police Medal for Faithful Service.
  - Succeeded by the Department of Correctional Services Medal for Faithful Service, 10 Years.

South African National Defence Force from 27 April 1994

- Official SANDF order of precedence:
  - Preceded by the John Chard Medal of the Republic of South Africa.
  - Succeeded by the Medal for Long Service and Good Conduct, Bronze of the Republic of Bophuthatswana.
- Official national order of precedence:
  - Preceded by the Police Medal for Faithful Service of the Republic of South Africa.
  - Succeeded by the Police Medal for Faithful Service of the Republic of Bophuthatswana.

== Description ==
Initially all South African military orders, decorations and medals were minted by the South African Mint, but with effect from c. 1980, the manufacturing of all new awards, as well as the further production of older awards, were put out to tender by private enterprises. Since the tooling of the older awards was retained by the Mint, private manufacturers had to manufacture their own tooling, which resulted in several variations in appearance. Poor quality control and cost cutting by manufacturers resulted in the acceptance and award of a large number of medals which were only 2 millimetres thick, with no raised rim and an undecorated ribbon suspender on the reverse, as depicted.

Second version, the thin so-called faxable version

Third version, with raised rim on reverse but undecorated suspender

A third version appeared in the early 1990s, with a raised rim on the reverse and a separating line (--- • ---) added between the Afrikaans and English inscriptions, but still with an undecorated suspender reverse, as depicted. On these the medal number was engraved near the bottom on the reverse side.

Medals minted from the mid-1990s were once again compliant with the description in the warrant in terms of which the medal was instituted, but they were struck in one piece with the suspenders. The separating line between the Afrikaans and English inscriptions of the previous version was omitted. The suspenders were shaped slightly differently from before and the bottom arms of the suspender met the medal inside two of the scalloped valleys on the rim, instead of on two of the apexes as before. This version is depicted in the main picture.

Obverse

The Good Service Medal, Bronze is a medallion with a scalloped edge and a raised rim, 38 millimetres in diameter and 3 millimetres thick at the rim. The ribbon suspender is decorated with proteas and leaves. The obverse is identical to that of the Permanent Force Good Service Medal of 1961 and depicts the pre-1994 South African Coat of Arms.

Reverse

The reverse is inscribed "VIR TROUE DIENS" and "FOR GOOD SERVICE" in four lines. The original medals, produced by the South African Mint, have a raised rim and decorated ribbon suspender on the reverse, similar to those of the obverse. The medals and suspenders were minted separately and soldered together. The medal number was impressed or engraved at the bottom on the rim.

Ribbons

When it was instituted as the South African Defence Force Good Service Medal, Bronze, for award to all elements of the South African Defence Force, three separate ribbons were used for the three elements of the Force. They were all 32 millimetres wide and green, with a 1 millimetre wide band 2 millimetres from each edge, in white to indicate Permanent Force service, in dark blue to indicate Citizen Force service or in orange to indicate Commando service. Orange, white and blue are the colours of the pre-1994 national flag.

These three ribbons were replaced by a single new ribbon in 1993, when the award of the medal was restricted to Permanent Force personnel and it was renamed the Good Service Medal, Bronze. The new ribbon was 32 millimetres wide and bronze coloured, with a single dark green band in the centre, 12 millimetres wide.

== Discontinuation ==
Conferment of the Good Service Medal, Bronze was discontinued in respect of services performed on or after 27 April 2003, when it was replaced by the new Medalje vir Troue Diens.
