= Just Nuisance =

Dog in the Royal Navy (1937–1944)

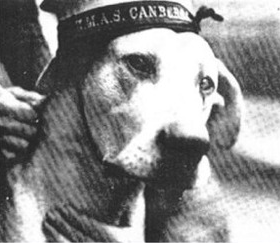
- Just Nuisance was entitled to the same benefits as any other Able Seaman, which included a cap. Here he sports a cap from HMAS Canberra, in one of many promotional photos taken during World War II.
- Species: Canis lupus familiaris
- Breed: Great Dane
- Sex: Male
- Born: 1 April 1937; Rondebosch, Cape Town
- Died: 1 April 1944 (aged 7); Simon's Town Naval Hospital, Simon's Town
- Resting place: Klaver Camp, Simon's Town
- Nationality: South Africa
- Occupation: Able seaman
- Employer: Royal Navy

Just Nuisance (1 April 1937 – 1 April 1944) was a South African dog and the only dog ever to be officially enlisted in the Royal Navy. He was a Great Dane who between 1939 and 1944 served at HMS Afrikander, a Royal Navy shore establishment in Simon's Town, South Africa. He died in 1944 at the age of seven years and was buried with full military honours.

== Biography ==
=== Early life ===
Although the exact date of Just Nuisance's birth is not known, it is usually stated that he was born on 1 April 1937 in Rondebosch, a suburb of Cape Town. He was sold to Benjamin Chaney, who later moved to Simon's Town to run the United Services Institute (USI). Just Nuisance quickly became popular with the patrons of the institute and in particular the ratings, who would feed him snacks and take him for walks. He began to follow them back to the naval base and dockyards, where he would lie on the decks of ships that were moored at the wharf. His preferred resting place was the top of the gangplank.

Since he was a large dog even for a Great Dane (he was almost 2 metres (6.6 ft) tall when standing on his hind legs), he presented a sizeable obstacle for those trying to board or disembark and he became affectionately known as Nuisance.

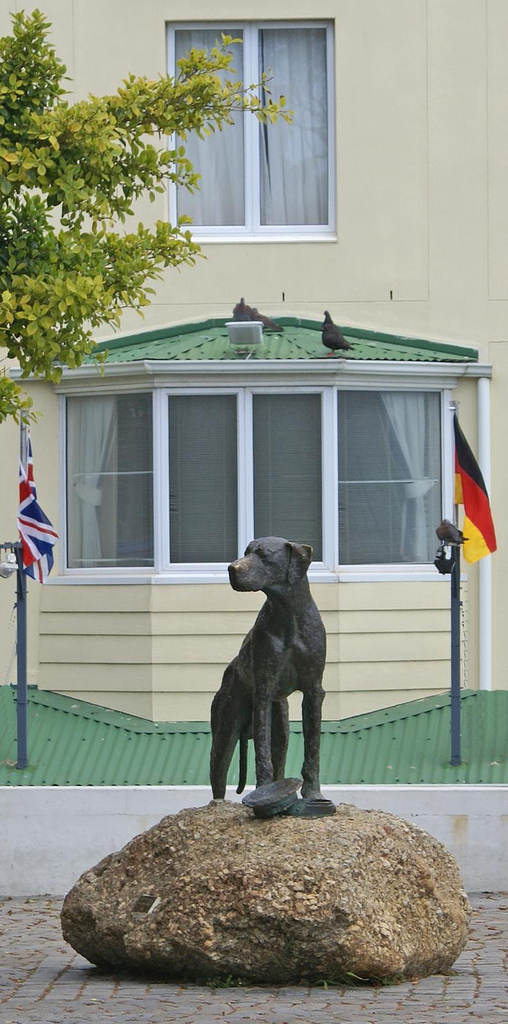
Just Nuisance statue in Simon's Town

=== Train travel ===
Nuisance was allowed to roam freely and, following the sailors, he began to take day trips by train as far afield as Cape Town, 22 miles (35 km) away. Despite the seamen's attempts to conceal him, the conductors would put him off the trains as soon as he was discovered. This did not cause the dog any difficulty, as he would wait for the next train, or walk to another station, where he would board the next train that came along.

Amused travellers would occasionally offer to pay his fare but officials of the state-owned railway company (South African Railways and Harbours) eventually warned Chaney that Nuisance would have to be put down unless he was prevented from boarding the trains or had his fares paid.

=== Naval service ===
The news that Nuisance was in danger of being put down spurred many of the sailors and locals to write to the Navy, pleading for something to be done. Although somebody offered to buy him a season ticket, naval command instead decided to enlist him by the book. As a member of the armed forces, he would be entitled to free rail travel, so the fare-dodging would no longer be a problem. For the next few years he would be a morale booster for the troops serving in World War II.

He was enlisted on 25 August 1939. His surname was entered as "Nuisance" and, rather than leaving the forename blank, he was given the moniker "Just". His trade was listed as "Bonecrusher" and his religious affiliation as "Scrounger", although this was later altered to the more charitable "Canine Divinity League (Anti-Vivisection)". To allow him to receive rations and because of his longstanding unofficial service, he was promoted from Ordinary seaman to Able seaman.

He never went to sea but fulfilled a number of roles ashore. He continued to accompany sailors on train journeys and escorted them back to base when the pubs closed. While many of his functions were of his own choosing, he also appeared at many promotional events, including his own 'wedding' to another Great Dane, Adinda. Adinda produced five pups as a result, two of which, named Victor and Wilhelmina, were auctioned off in Cape Town to raise funds for the war effort.

Nuisance's service record was not exemplary. Aside from the offences of travelling on the trains without his free pass, being absent without leave, losing his collar and refusing to leave the pub at closing time, his record shows that he was sentenced to having his bones allowance removed for seven days for sleeping in an improper place – to wit, the bed of one of the petty officers. He also fought with the mascots of ships that put in at Simon's Town, resulting in the deaths of at least two of them.

=== Discharge and death ===
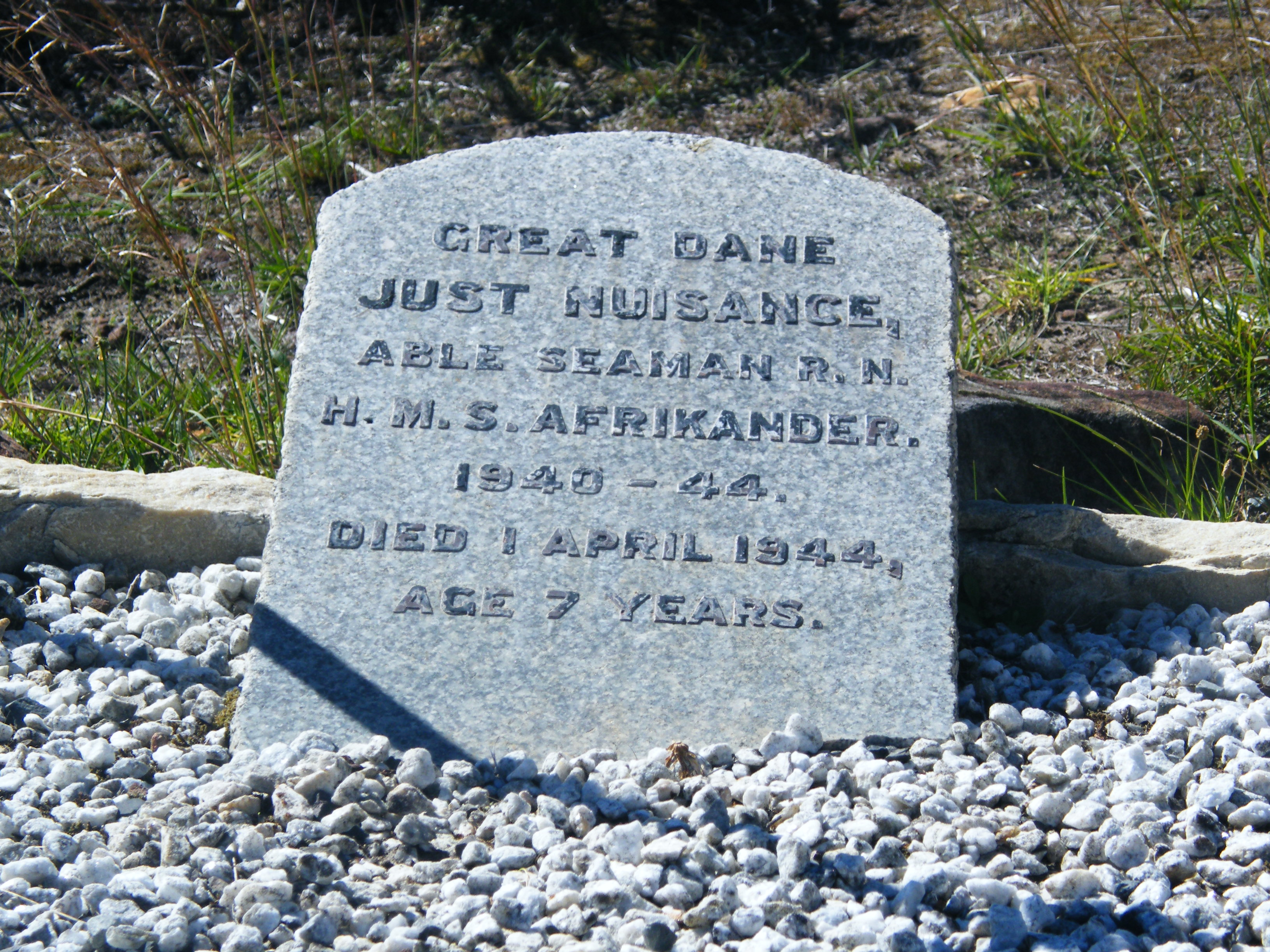
Headstone for Just Nuisance's grave

Nuisance was at some point involved in a car accident. This caused thrombosis, which gradually paralysed him, so on 1 January 1944 he was discharged from the Navy. His condition continued to deteriorate, and on 1 April 1944 he was taken to Simon's Town Naval Hospital where, on the advice of the naval veterinary surgeon, he was put down.

The next day he was taken to Klawer Camp, where his body was draped with a Royal Naval White Ensign and he was buried with full naval honours, including a gun salute and the playing of the "Last Post". A simple granite headstone marks his grave, which is on the top of the hill at Klawer, at the former SA Navy Signal School. A statue was erected in Jubilee Square in Simon's Town to commemorate his life.

The Simon's Town Museum has an exhibition dedicated to his story, and since 2000 there has been an annual parade of Great Danes from which a lookalike is selected.

== See also ==
- Bamse, heroic St. Bernard dog officially enrolled in the Royal Norwegian Navy
- List of individual dogs
- Military animal
