= Simon's Town Museum =

- Simonstad Museum
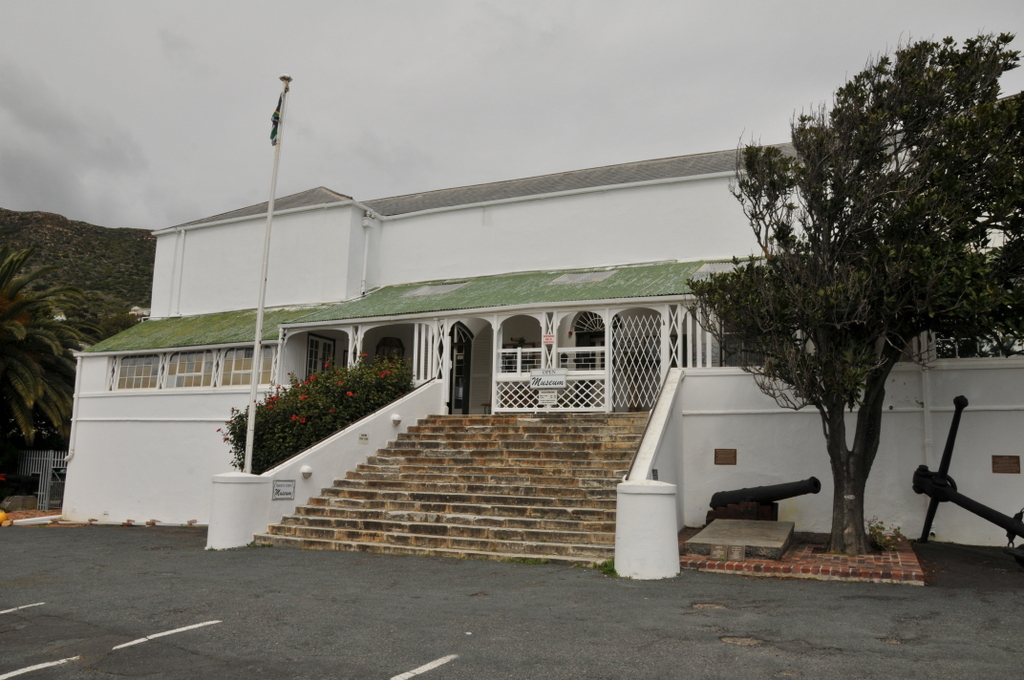
- Established: 1977
- Location: The Residency, Court Road, Simon's Town
- Coordinates: 34.191366°S 18.427567°E
- Type: Community museum
- Curator: Cathy Salter-Jansen
- Public transit access: Simon's Town Railway station
- Parking: Carpark in Court Road, outside the Simon's Town Museum
- Website: Official Website

Established in 1977, Simon's Town Museum is a community museum situated in Simon's Town, a coastal town in the Western Cape Province of the Republic of South Africa. It is a province-aided museum which receives support from the Government of the Western Cape Province.

== History ==
The Simon's Town Museum was established in 1977 by a group of enthusiastic volunteers, the MOTHS (War veterans of the Memorable Order of Tin Hats) of the “Snoekie Shellhole” and the Simon's Town Historical Society. At first, the Simon's Town Museum was located in the old Headmaster's house, but its rapid expansion led the board of trustees to look for new premises. They bought and renovated The Residency, an historical building erected by Governor Joachim van Plettenberg in 1777, to serve as the winter residence of the Dutch East India Company Governor at the Cape of Good Hope, when on official business at Simon's Bay. To date, it remains the home of the Simon's Town Museum.

== Function and themes ==
The Simon's Town Museum records and preserves all aspects of the history of the Simon's Town community and portrays the vibrant past of this small, maritime port, whose position on The Cape Sea Route, resulted in a history which is intertwined with that of many nations around the world.

== Development of Simon's Town ==
From its earliest days Simon's Town was very cosmopolitan in nature. Consequently, the museum depicts pre-colonial history, the establishment of the refreshment station at Simon's Bay by the Dutch East India Company in 1743 and the First and Second British Occupations, from 1795 to 1803 and 1806 to 1957 respectively. The Royal Navy established a permanent base at Simon's Town in 1813 and remained for 144 years.

== Apartheid ==
The greatest tragedy to befall the people of Simon's Town, was the Forced Removals under the Group Areas Act by the Apartheid government in 1967. It led to the devastation of the Simon's Town community. One of the Simon's Town Museum's most important undertakings has been Project Phoenix. It was launched in 1996 to record and preserve the history of the former residents of Simon's Town and added much new material to the museum's collection. Former residents, museum staff and volunteers meet regularly and work together to ensure that the museum's collections become more representative of the Simon's Town community.

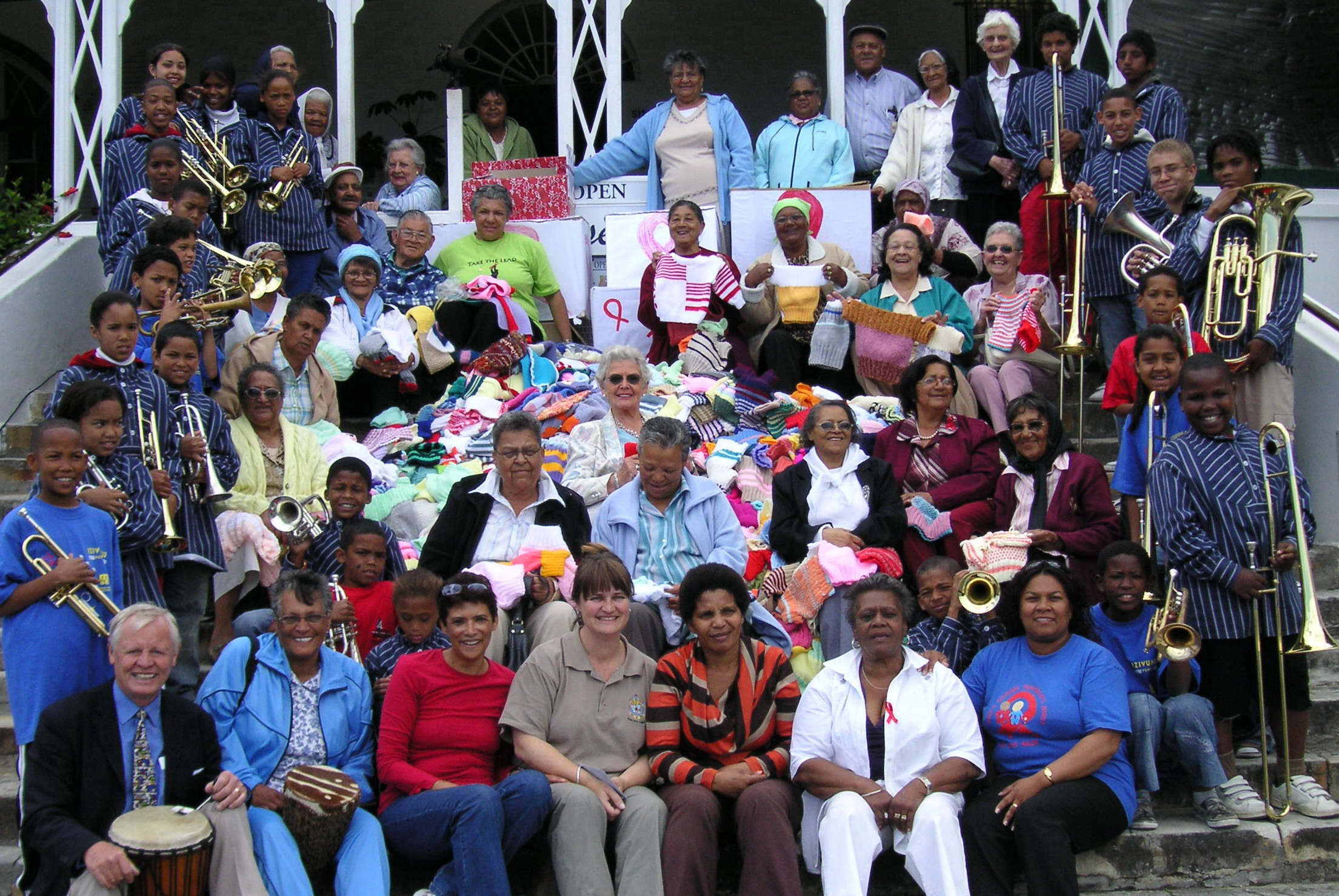
Participants in the Knit-a-Jersey Project for HIV-Aids Day 2007, on the steps of the Simon's Town Museum with jerseys knitted by the community.

== Other activities ==
In addition to its exhibitions and projects, Simon's Town Museum undertakes a number of education and outreach programmes and regularly provides activities linked to South Africa's national days.

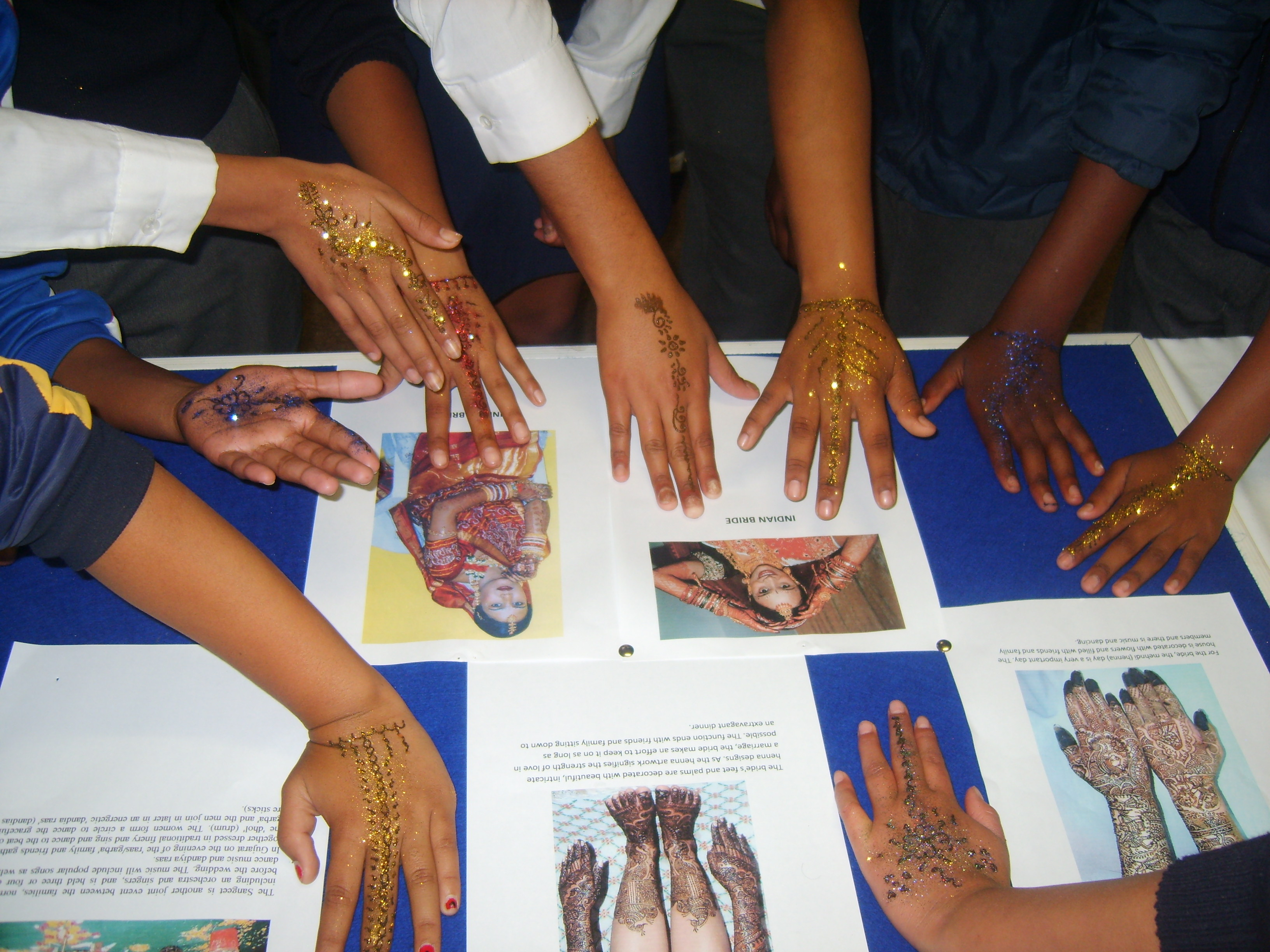
Learners taking part in International Museums Day 2010. The theme was Social Harmony.

== See also ==
- South African Naval Museum
- Just Nuisance
