= South African Naval Museum =

Coordinates: 34°11′31″S 18°25′41″E

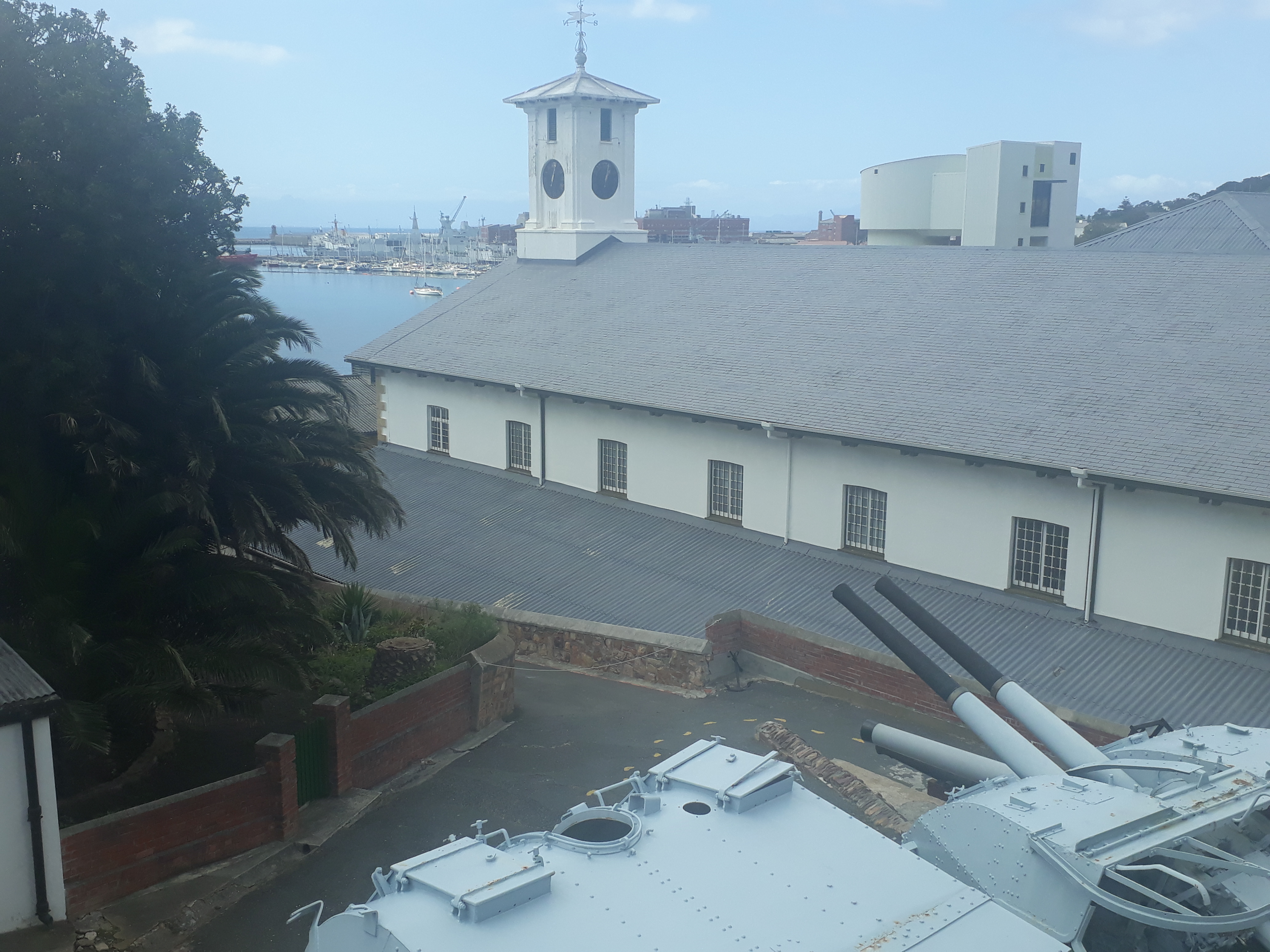
- Established: 1 April 1993
- Location: Dockyard Magazine and Storehouse, Simon's Town South Africa
- Type: Naval museum
- Public transit access: Simon's Town railway station
- Website: sanavymuseum.co.za

The South African Naval Museum is a maritime museum in Simon's Town, South Africa. It contains collections and artefacts related to the maritime history of South Africa and the South African Navy.

== History ==
The South African Naval Museum at the South African Navy's base in Simon's Town dates back to 1966 when a naval historical collection was displayed at the Castle of Good Hope Military Museum in Cape Town. In the mid 1970s this collection was transferred to the Martello Tower in Simon's Town and, thereafter, to Fort Wynyard where it was enlarged to include a much wider display of naval associated artifacts. With the decentralisation of Museums from the former South African Defence Forces Director Military Museums to the various Arms of Service in June 1987, the South African Navy Museum (Martello Tower) was transferred to the functional control of the South African Navy, while Fort Wynyard was transferred to Western Province Command (Army).

Investigations into the establishment of a museum for the South African Navy in Simon's Town were launched during 1988 and it was eventually decided that the most appropriate location for the new museum would be the former Royal Navy Mast House that dates back to 1815 and the adjacent Dutch Store House that dates back to 1743. Both buildings are located in the historic West Yard of Naval Base Simon's Town.

The new South African Naval Museum was opened by Chief of the Navy, Vice Admiral Robert Simpson-Anderson, on 1 April 1993. The first phase of the new display comprised exhibitions of the historic clock tower and part of the sail loft. The second phase of the development included the utilisation of two display areas on ground level with the history and functioning of the Submarine, Divers and Weapons branch suitably displayed. The South African Navy (SAN) themselves were involved in the conversion of the building to that of a museum.

== Displays ==
=== Chiefs of the Navy display ===
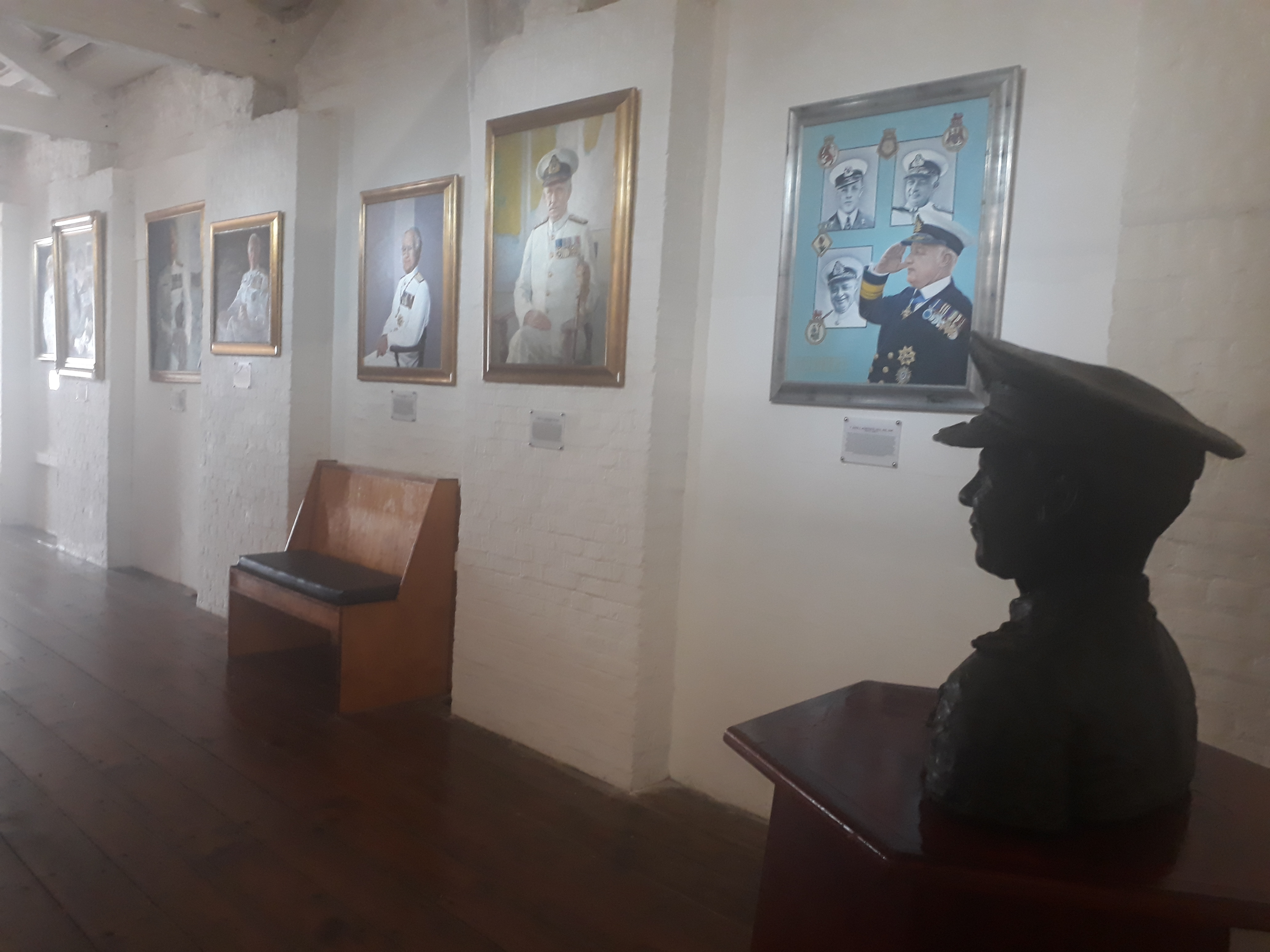
Chiefs of the Navy display

The museum's collections include portraits of all nine of the previous Chiefs of the South African Navy, ranging from Admiral Hugo Biermann to Vice Admiral Johan Retief.

=== Gunnery display ===
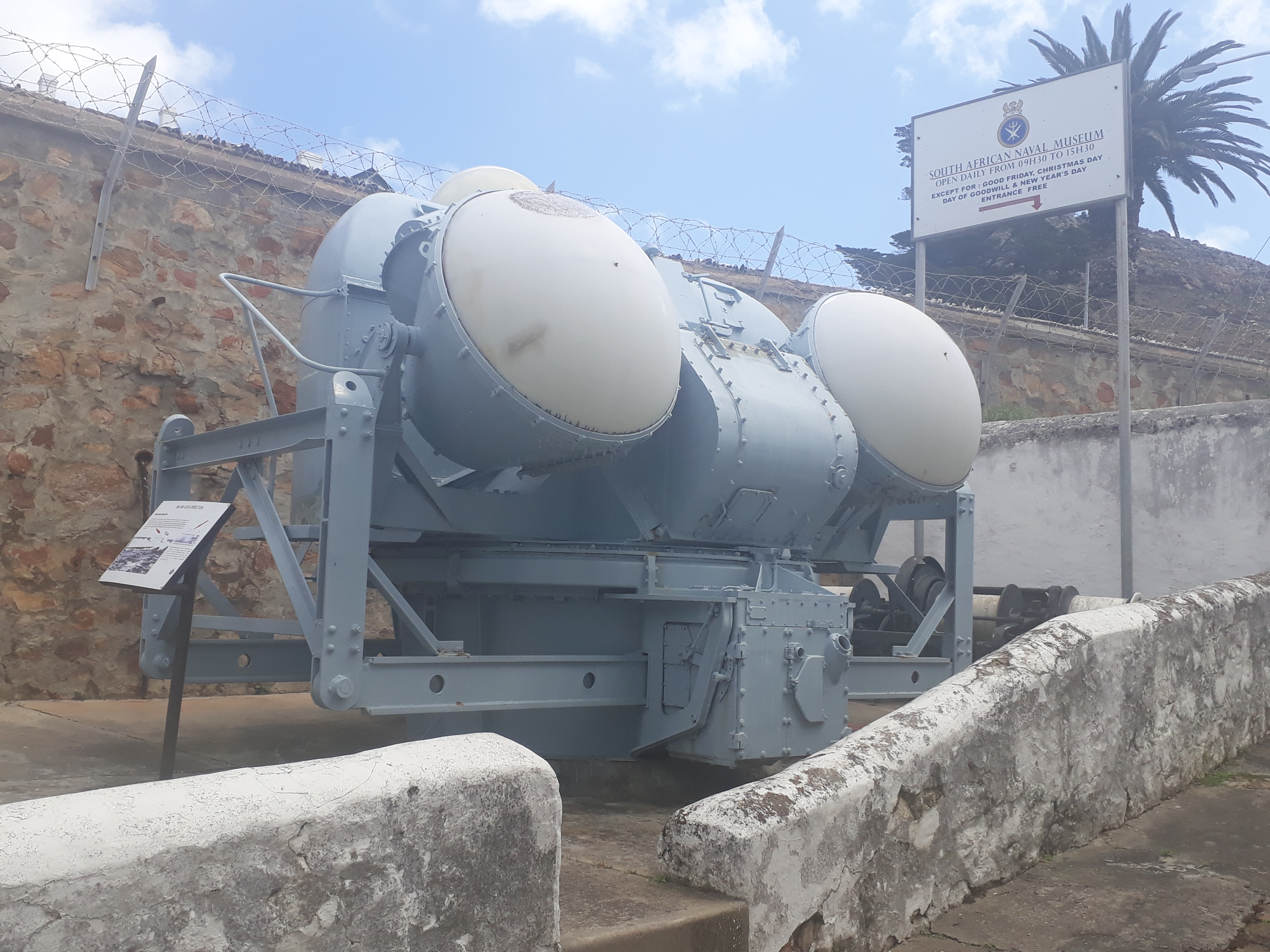
Mk 6M Gun Director SA Naval Museum

A Mk 6M Gun Director is on display, originally fitted to the President-class Type 12 frigates that were in service with the South African Navy between 1959 and 1985. The two oval shaped radomes contained the Type 275 radar; one for transmitting and the other for receiving. The returned signal provided the range and distance of the target. The analogue computers in the transmitting station would calculate the aim-off and pass on to the selected guns (normally the 4.5 inch gun) for the correct bearing and elevation.

=== Torpedo and Anti-Submarine display ===
This exhibit includes a Westland Wasp helicopter. In October 1963, the first of sixteen Wasp helicopters were delivered to the South African Air Force. Wasp 85 on display was taken on charge on 25 May 1964 and was issued to 22 Flight (later re-designated 22 Squadron SAAF) at AFS Ysterplaat. Two South African Navy destroyers, the SAS Simon van der Stel and SAS Jan van Riebeeck were converted to carry helicopter in 1964 and 1966 respectively and fitted with a flight-deck and hangar. Similarly the President (Modified Type 12) class frigates SAS President Kruger, SAS President Steyn and SAS President Pretorius were also converted to carry a single Wasp helicopter to be used in an anti-submarine or survey role. The hydrographic survey vessel SAS Protea and fleet replenishment vessel SAS Tafelberg carried the Wasp helicopter in similar fashion. Of the sixteen helicopters delivered, six were lost in service. One particular Wasp that ditched at sea off Milnerton was salvaged and rebuilt to fly again. The Wasps were eventually withdrawn from SAAF service in 1990. Wasp 85 on display, was donated to the South African Naval Museum in Simon's Town in 2003 from the South African Air Force Museum at Ysterplaat.

=== General Botha display ===
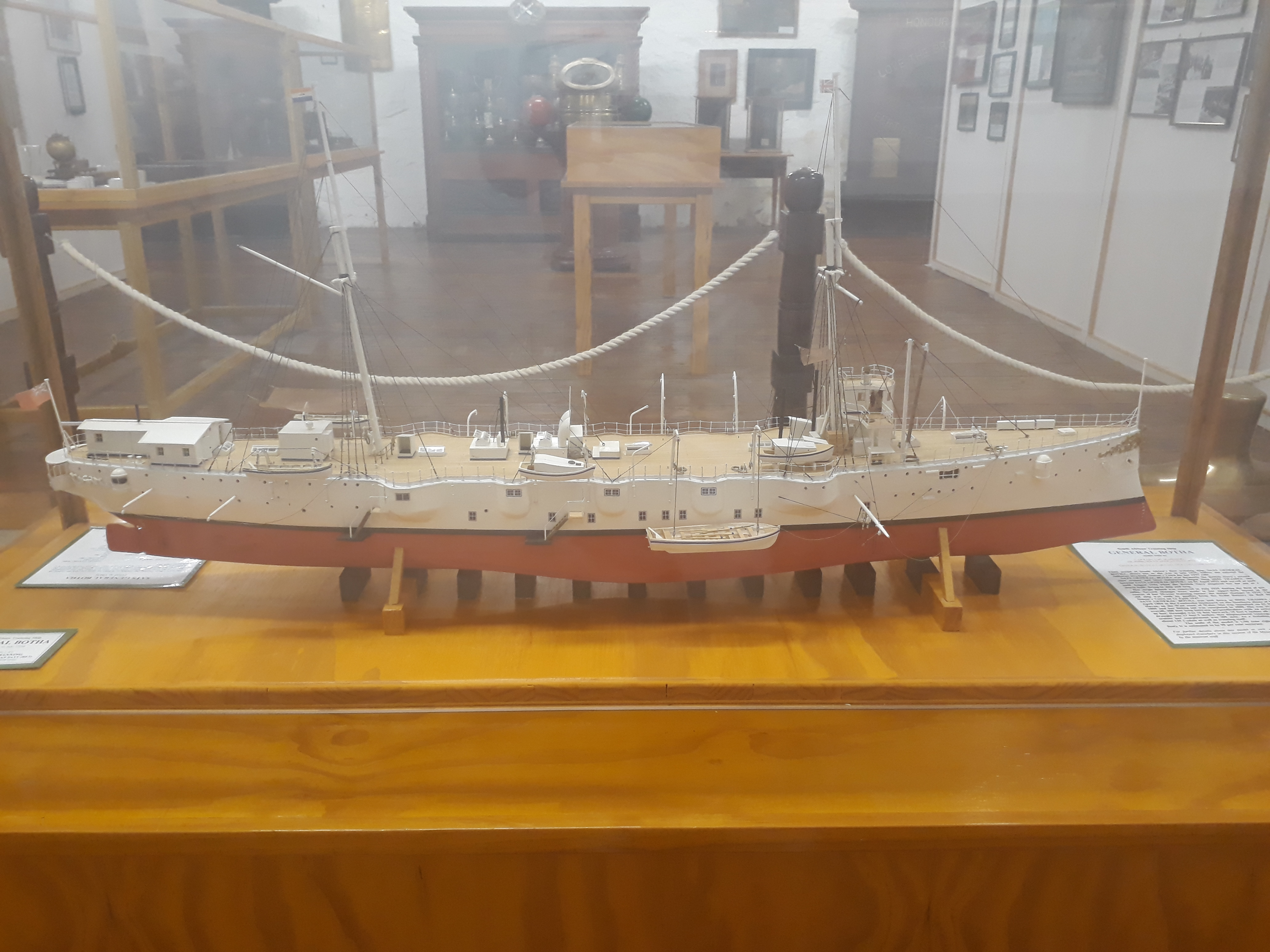
Model of the TS General Botha at the naval museum

This exhibit focuses on the South African Training Ship General Botha (ex HMS Thames) and its successors, the South African Nautical College GENERAL BOTHA and the South African Merchant Navy Academy GENERAL BOTHA. As a training establishment, GENERAL BOTHA functioned for 67 years to educate and prepare young men as officers for South Africa's Merchant Service and Navy and until 1961, for the British Navy too. GENERAL BOTHA was unquestionably the “cradle” of both the South African Navy and the South African Merchant Service.

=== Transformation display ===
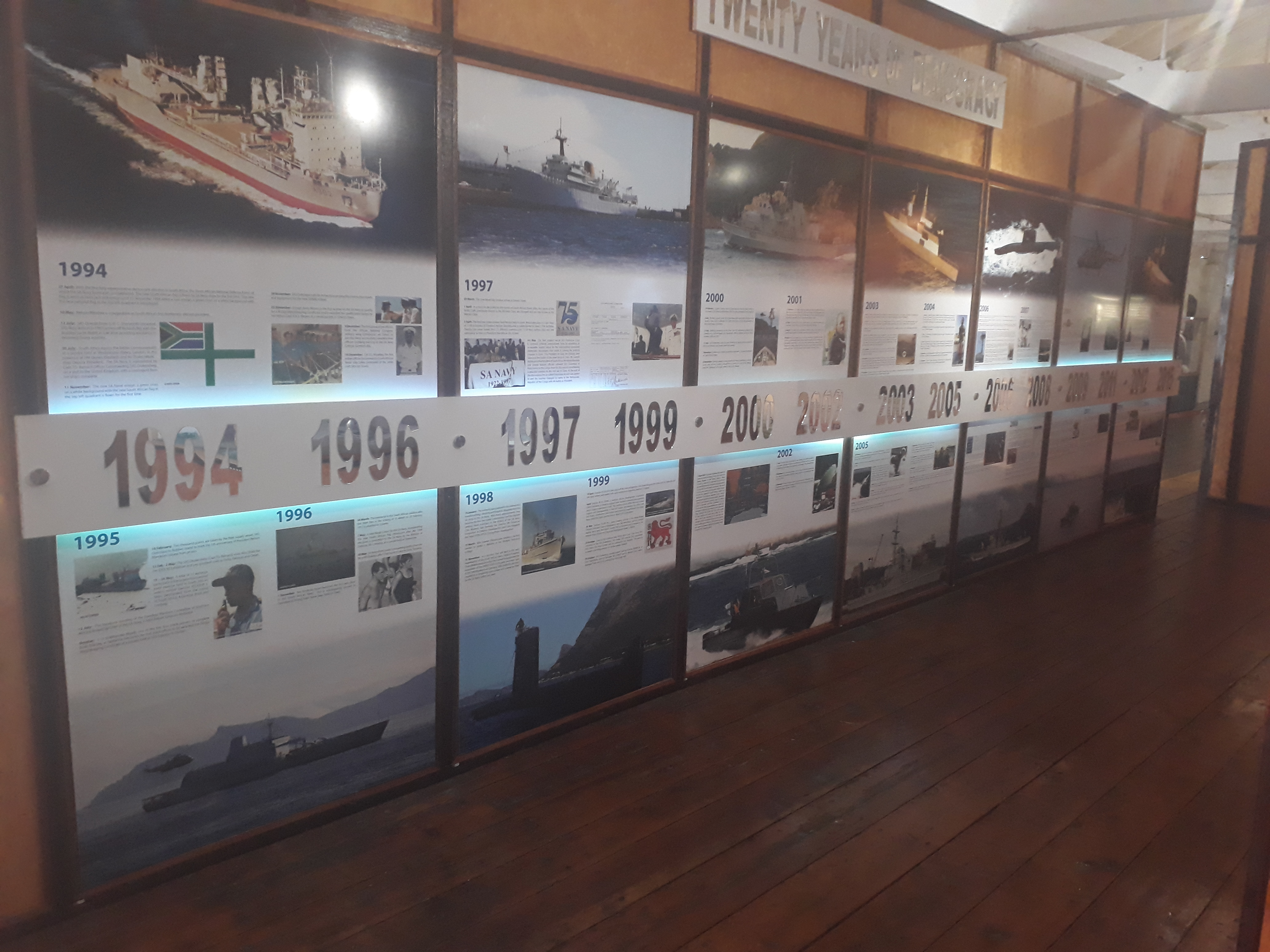
The Transformation display at the museum

The Transformation Display at the SA Naval Museum was officially opened by Flag Officer Fleet, Rear Admiral Bubele Mhlana on Wednesday 11 March 2015. The project was initiated by Vice Admiral Refiloe Johannes Mudimu shortly after his appointment as Chief of the Navy in 2005. The task was given to the Naval Museum to provide a new display that will tell the story of the transformation of race and gender in the South African Navy through the years. Its purpose was to provide a much needed balance of our history that would make the SA Naval Museum more representative of the entire Navy and its people, as we see it today. The Transformation Display focuses on important landmark events that saw the transformation of the South African Navy, through the years:

- The first non-Europeans serving in the naval forces during the Second World War
- The involvement of African dockyard workers in Simon's Town through the years
- The first appointment of Coloured people into the South African Navy during the 1960s
- The inclusion of women in uniform during the early 1970s
- The formation of the Indian Training Battalion and SAS Jalsena during the 1970s
- The integration of Non Statutory Forces, Umkhonto we Sizwe and the Azanian People's Liberation Army into the South African Navy after 1994

Interwoven with these historic events are the stories of many individuals that lived and died ...

- The tragic story of SS Mendi
- The valour of Job Maseko during the Second World War
- The sad loss of Cape Corps members off Kalkbay in 1965
- The achievements of women in the South African Navy
- Umkhonto we Sizwe training in Russia
- The South African Navy's integration success story at SAS Saldanha and the South African Naval College

=== Museum of Submarine Technology ===
A major exhibit of the museum's is the SAS Assegaai, a Daphné class submarine. It is the first and thus far only South African Navy submarine to have been converted into a museum ship.

== Opening Hours ==
The museum is open seven days a week, daily opening times 09:30-15:30 except Good Friday, Christmas Day and New Year's Day. Entry is free of charge, but a voluntary donation towards the SA Naval Museum Fund can be made at the reception.

== Gallery ==
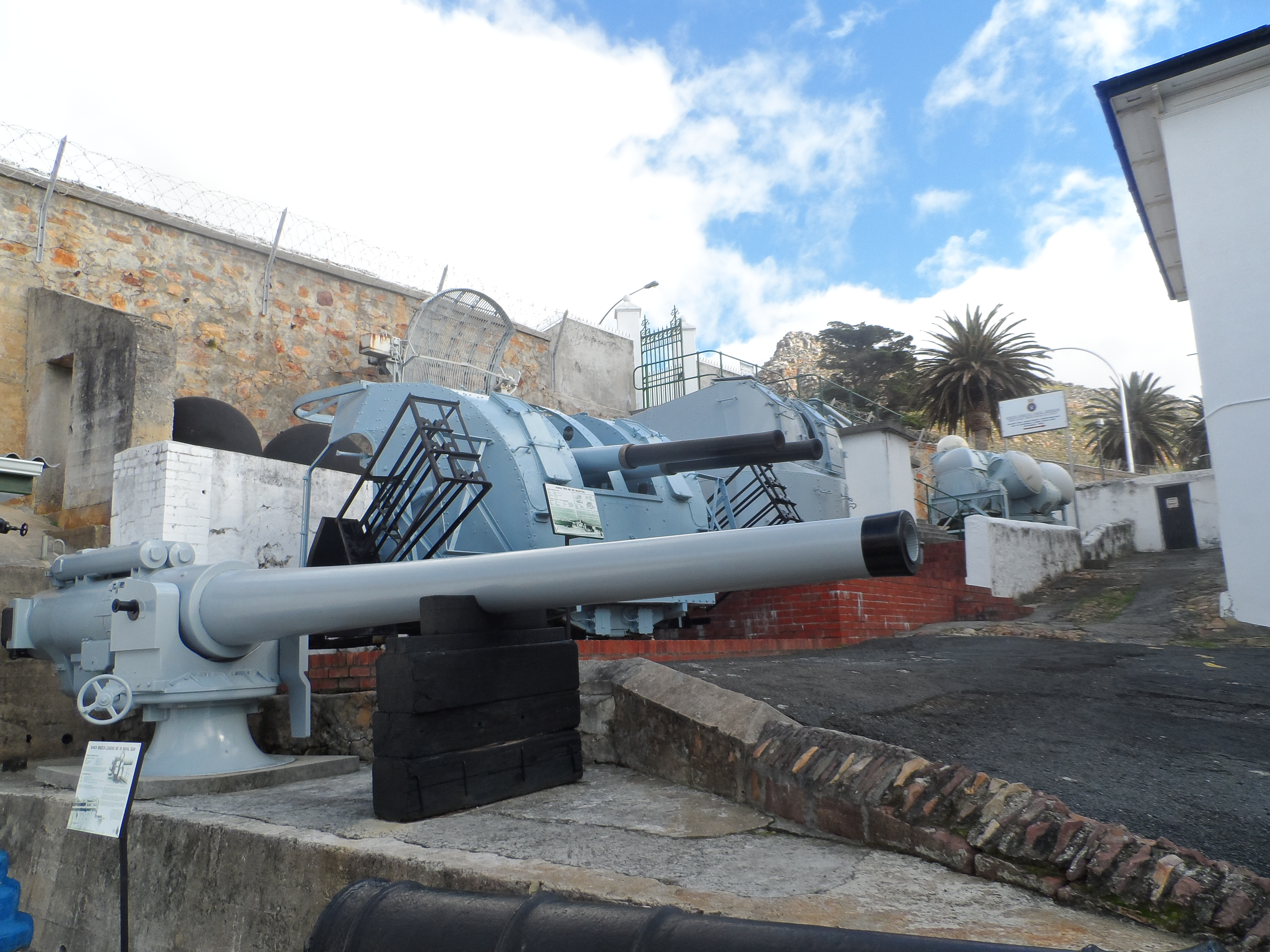
Outdoor exhibits

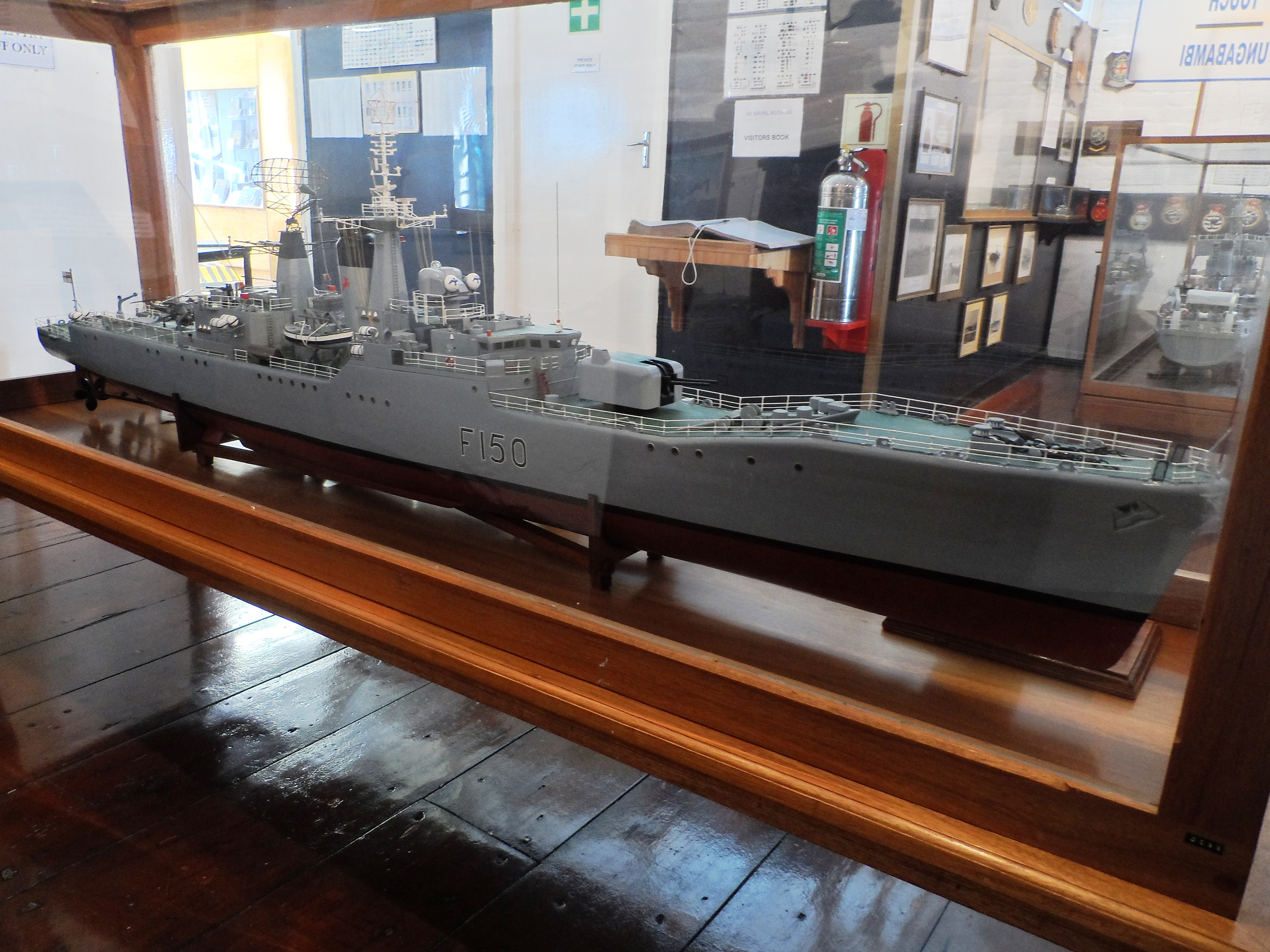
Model Frigate

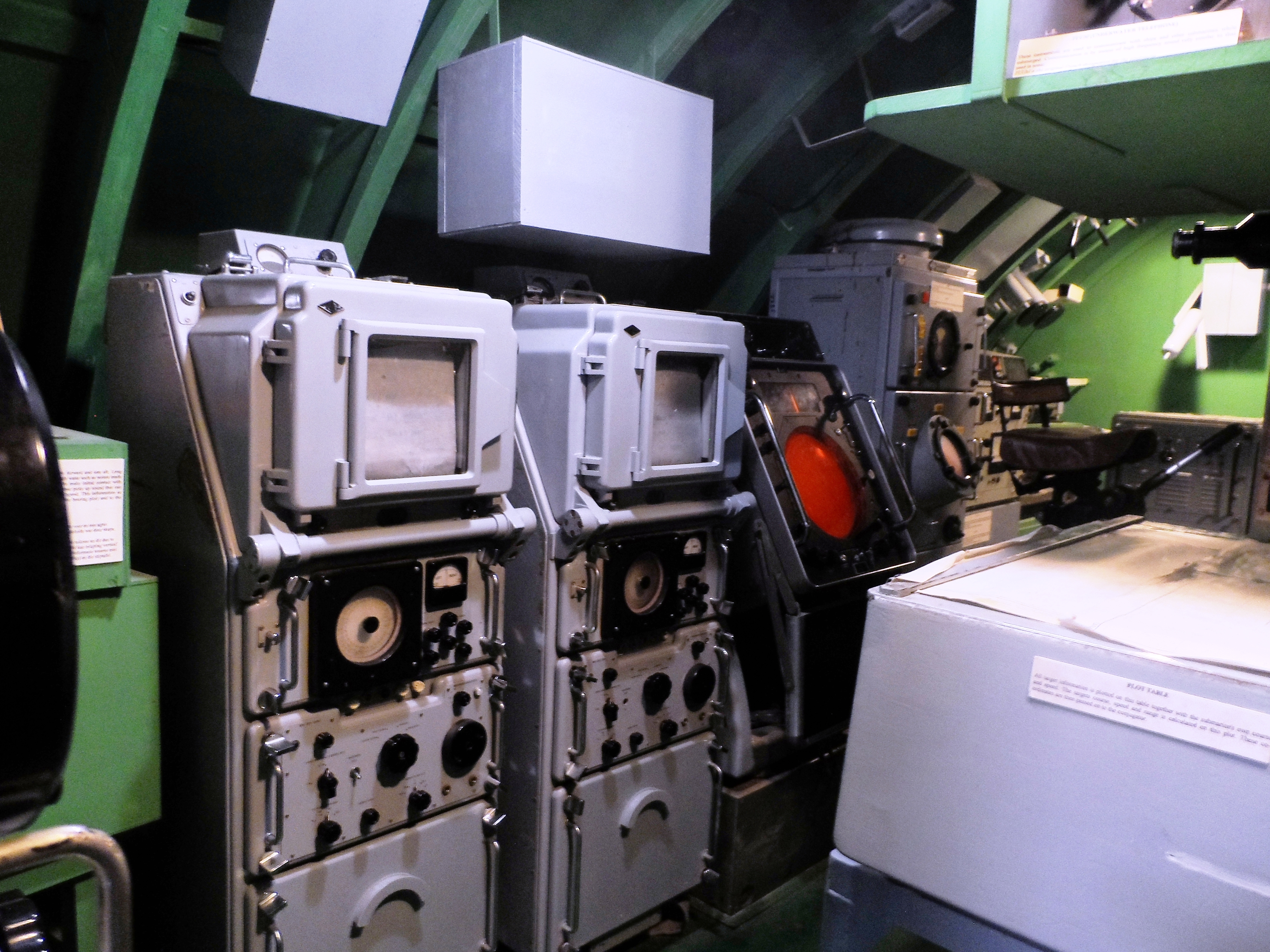
Submarine simulator

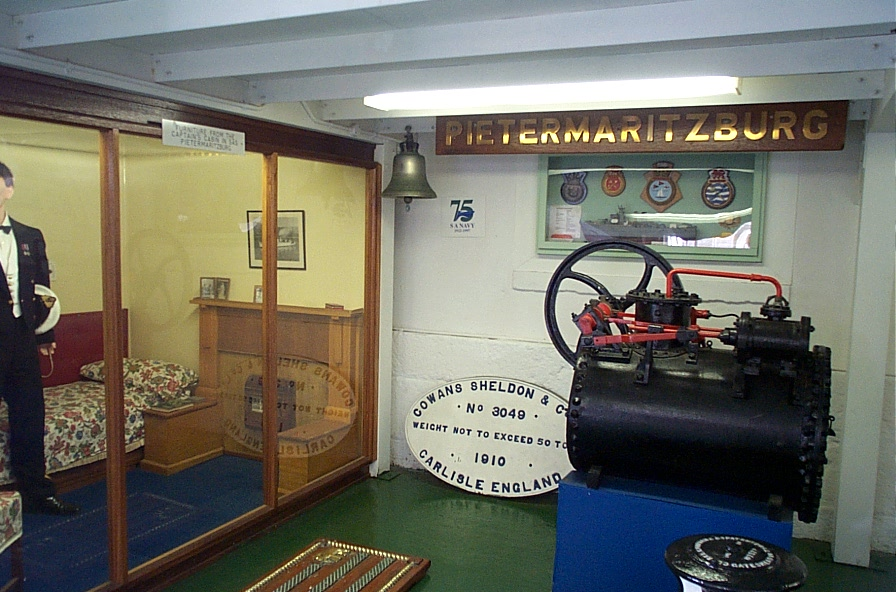
SAS Pietermaritzburg display

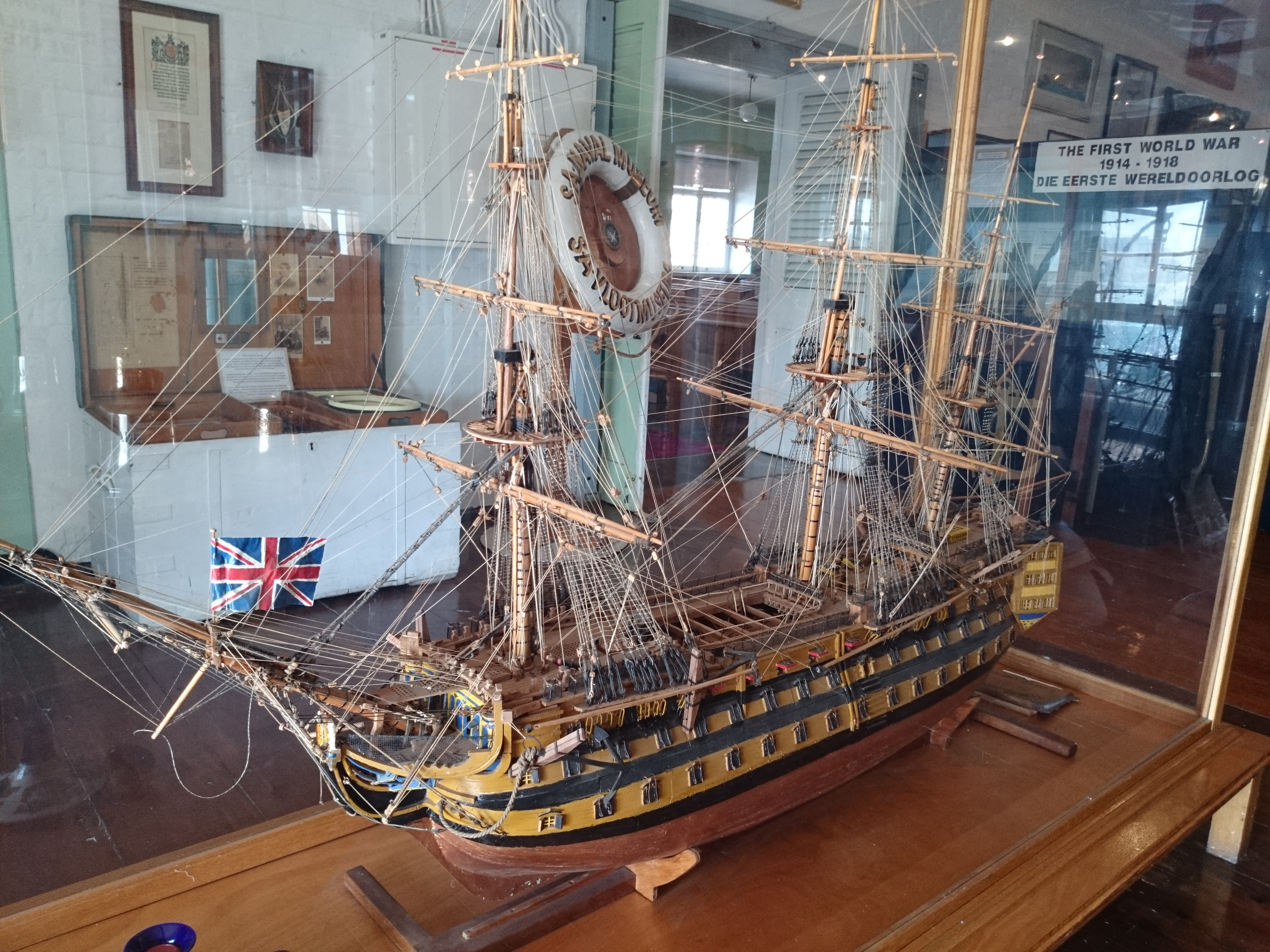
HMS Victory model

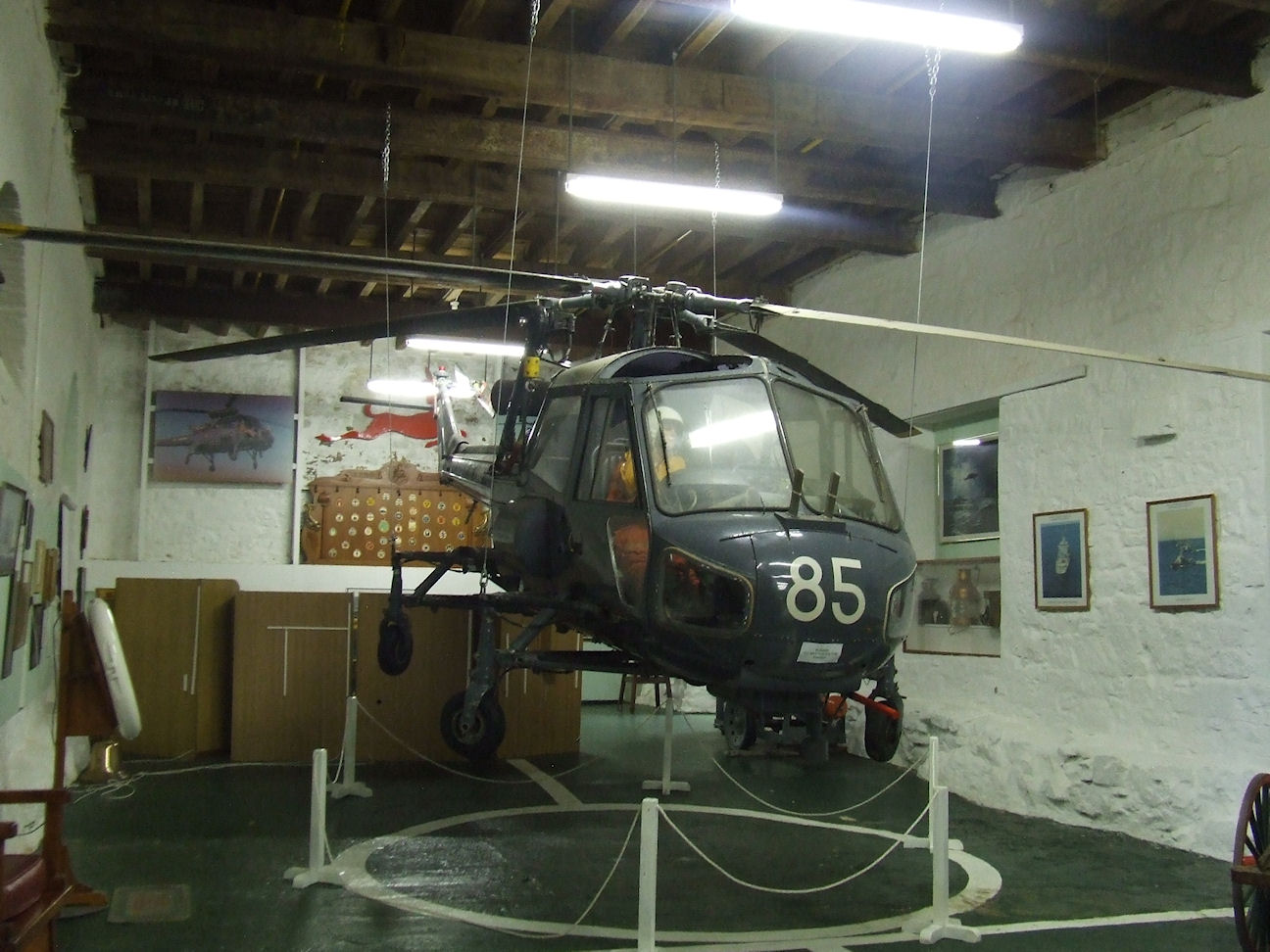
Carrier-based helicopter display

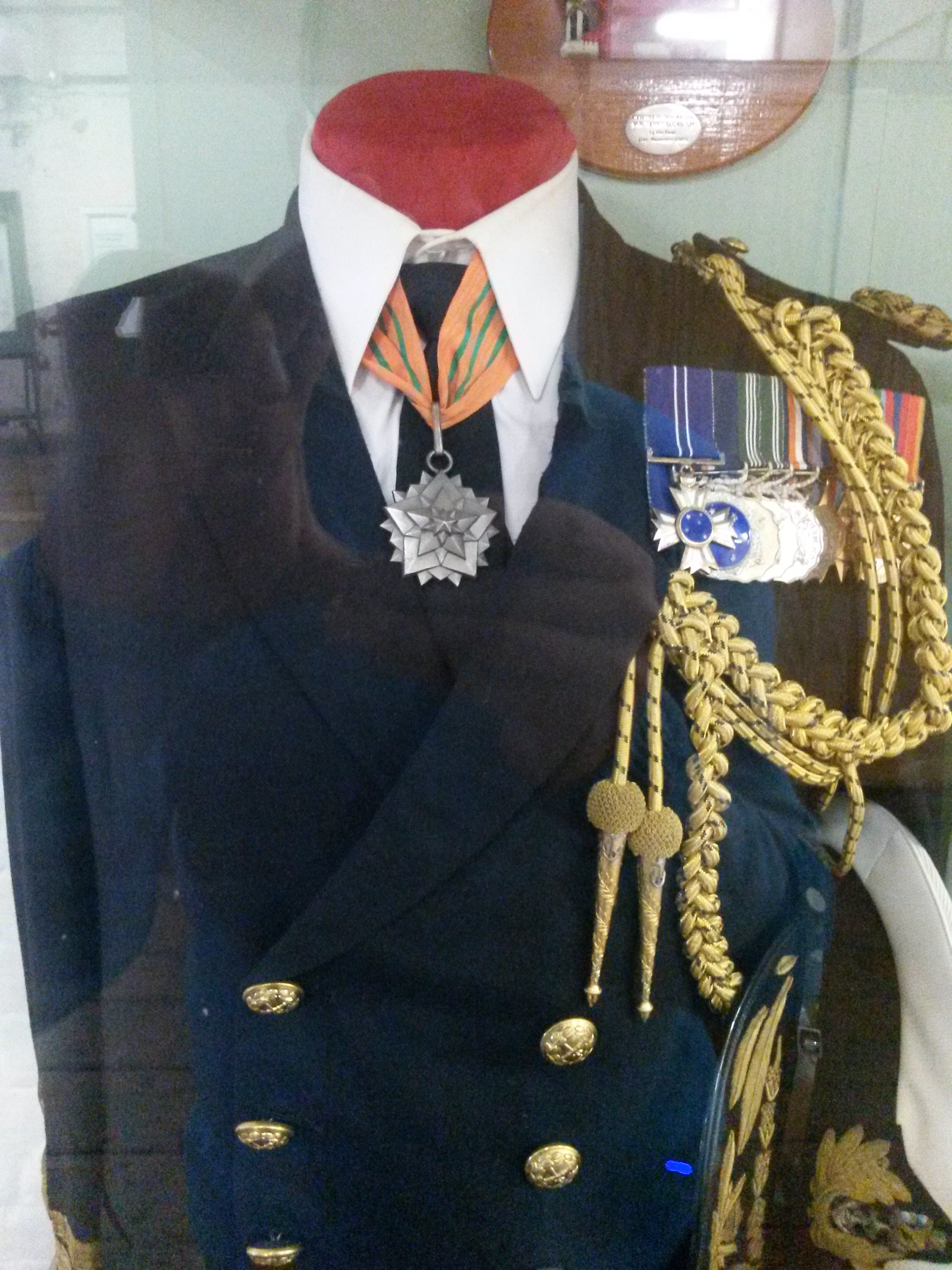
A rear admiral's uniform in South African Navy

== See also ==
- South African National Museum of Military History
- Military history of South Africa
- Simon's Town Museum
