= Simon's Town =

Seaside town in South Africa

Simon's Town Simonstad
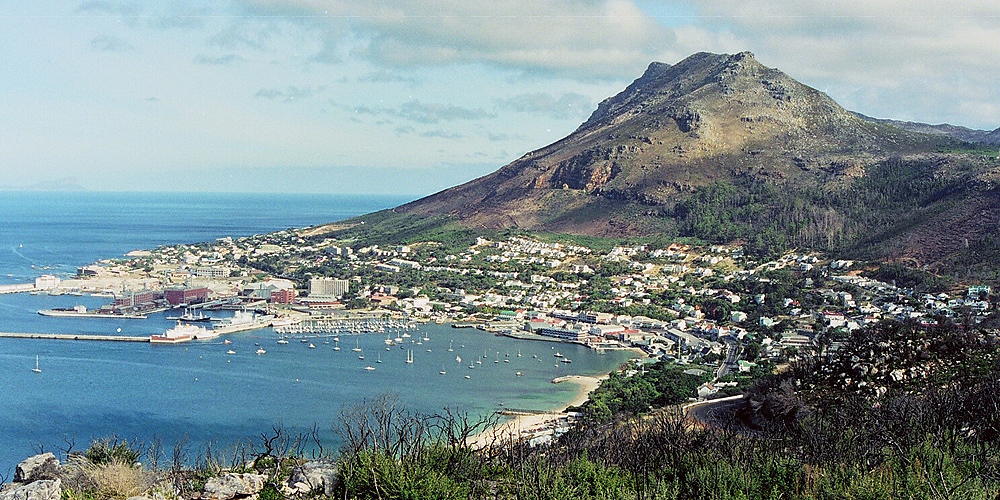
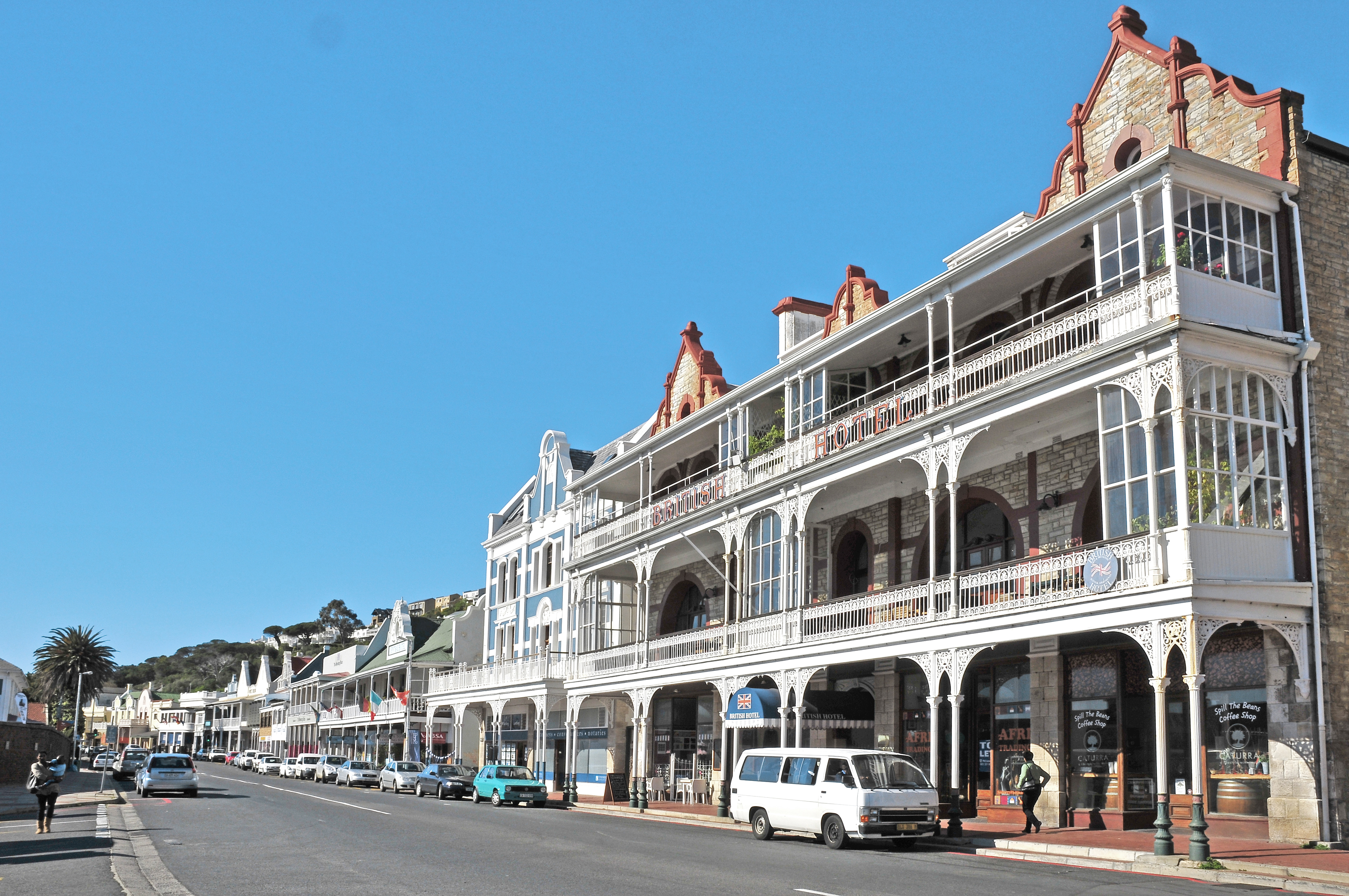
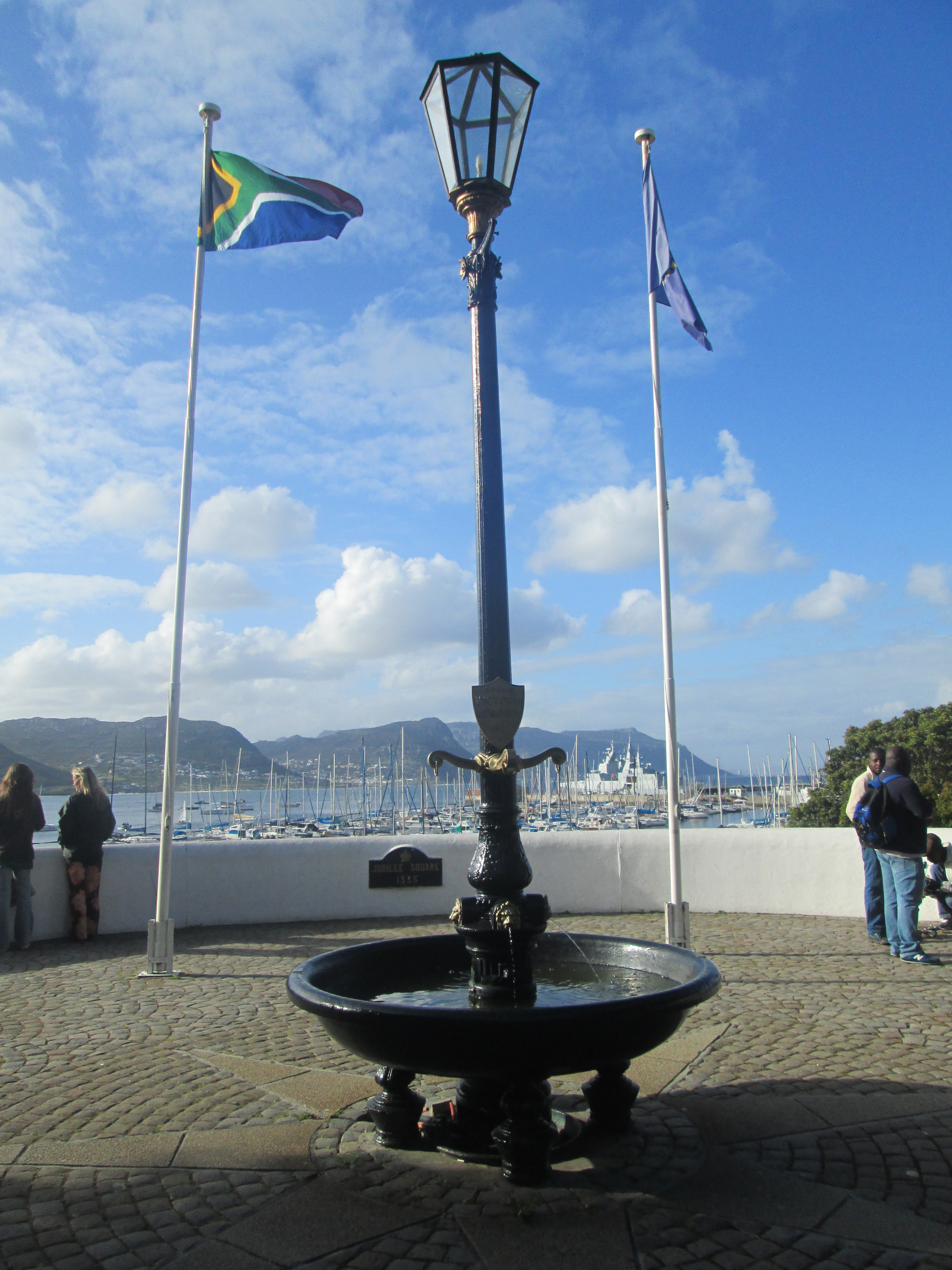
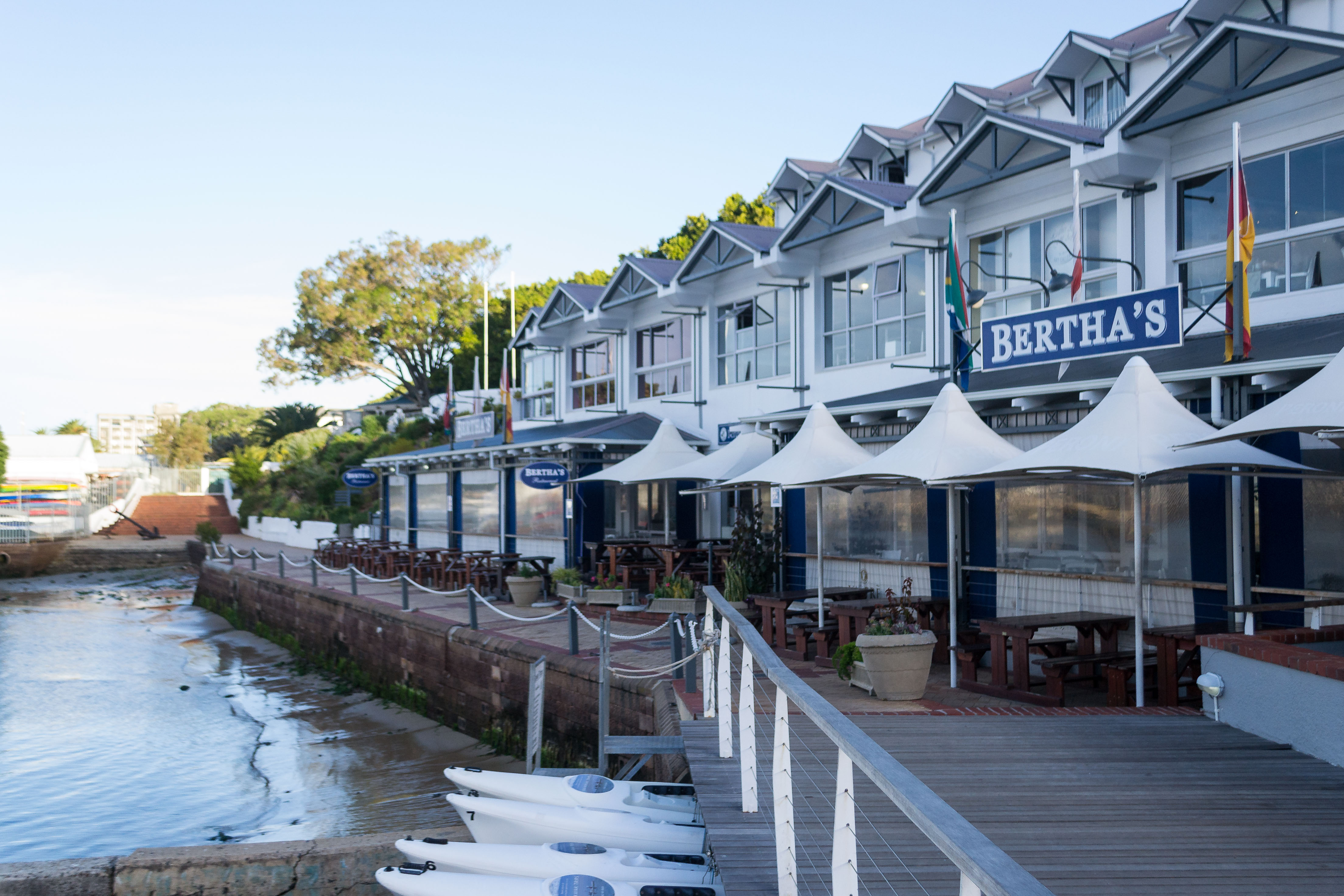
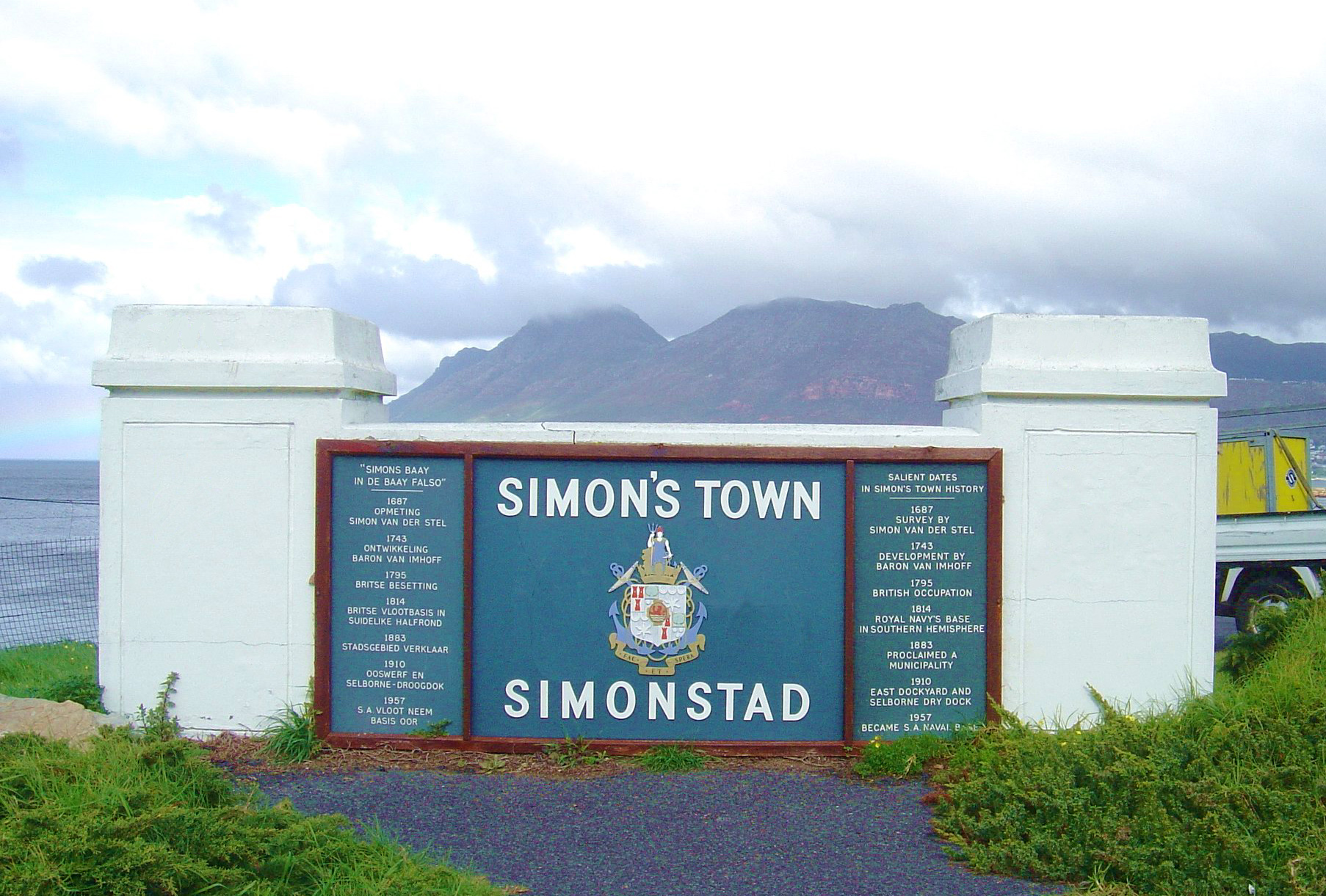
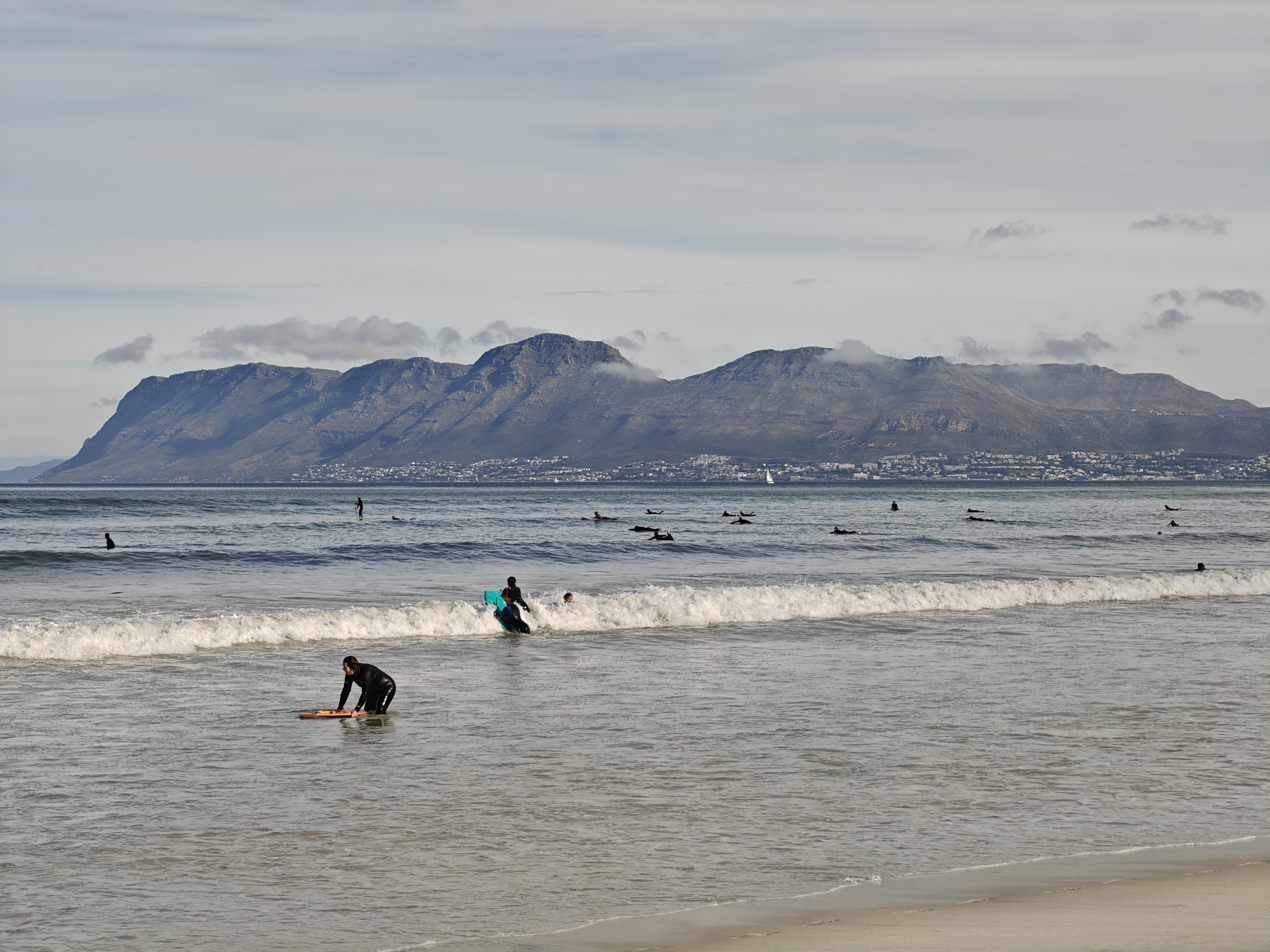
- Clockwise from top: View of Simon's Town; Jubilee Square; Welcome Sign; Simon's Town Waterfront; St George's Street; Simon's Town from Muizenberg Beach

- Location within Western Cape Location within South Africa Location within Africa
- Coordinates: 34°11′36″S 18°26′00″E
- Country: South Africa
- Province: Western Cape
- Municipality: City of Cape Town
- Established: 1680; 346 years ago
- Named for: Simon van der Stel

Government
  - Councillor: Simon Liell-Cock (DA)

Area
  - Total: 19.81 km^{2} (7.65 sq mi)

Population (2011)
  - Total: 6,569
  - Density: 331.6/km^{2} (858.8/sq mi)

Racial makeup (2011)
  - Black African: 24.5%
  - Coloured: 12.7%
  - Indian/Asian: 4.4%
  - White: 56.4%
  - Other: 2.0%

First languages (2011)
  - English: 68%
  - Afrikaans: 19%
  - Xhosa: 3.5%
  - Zulu: 2.5%
  - Other: 1%
- Time zone: UTC+2 (SAST)
- Postal code (street): 7975
- PO box: 7995
- Area code: 021

Simon's Town (Afrikaans: Simonstad), sometimes spelled Simonstown, is a town in the Western Cape, and a suburb of the City of Cape Town, South Africa. It is home to Naval Base Simon's Town, the South African Navy's largest naval base. It is located on the shores of Simon's Bay in False Bay, on the eastern side of the Cape Peninsula, and forms part of the Southern Peninsula region of Cape Town.

For more than two centuries, Simon's Town has been a naval base and harbour, first for the British Royal Navy and now the South African Navy. The town is named after Simon van der Stel, an early governor of the Cape Colony.

== Topography ==
The land rises steeply from near the water's edge and the town is boxed in along the shoreline by the heights above. The small harbour itself is protected from swells by a breakwater that was built with thousands of huge blocks of sandstone quarried out of the face of the mountain above.

Simon's Town is now in effect a suburb of the City of Cape Town Metropolitan Municipality. The Simon's Town railway station is the terminus of the Southern Line, a railway line that runs south of the central business district of Cape Town. In places, the railway line runs along the steep eastern shore of False Bay, and in bad weather waves and foam from some heavy swells wet the trains.

== Attractions and amenities ==
=== Boulders Beach ===
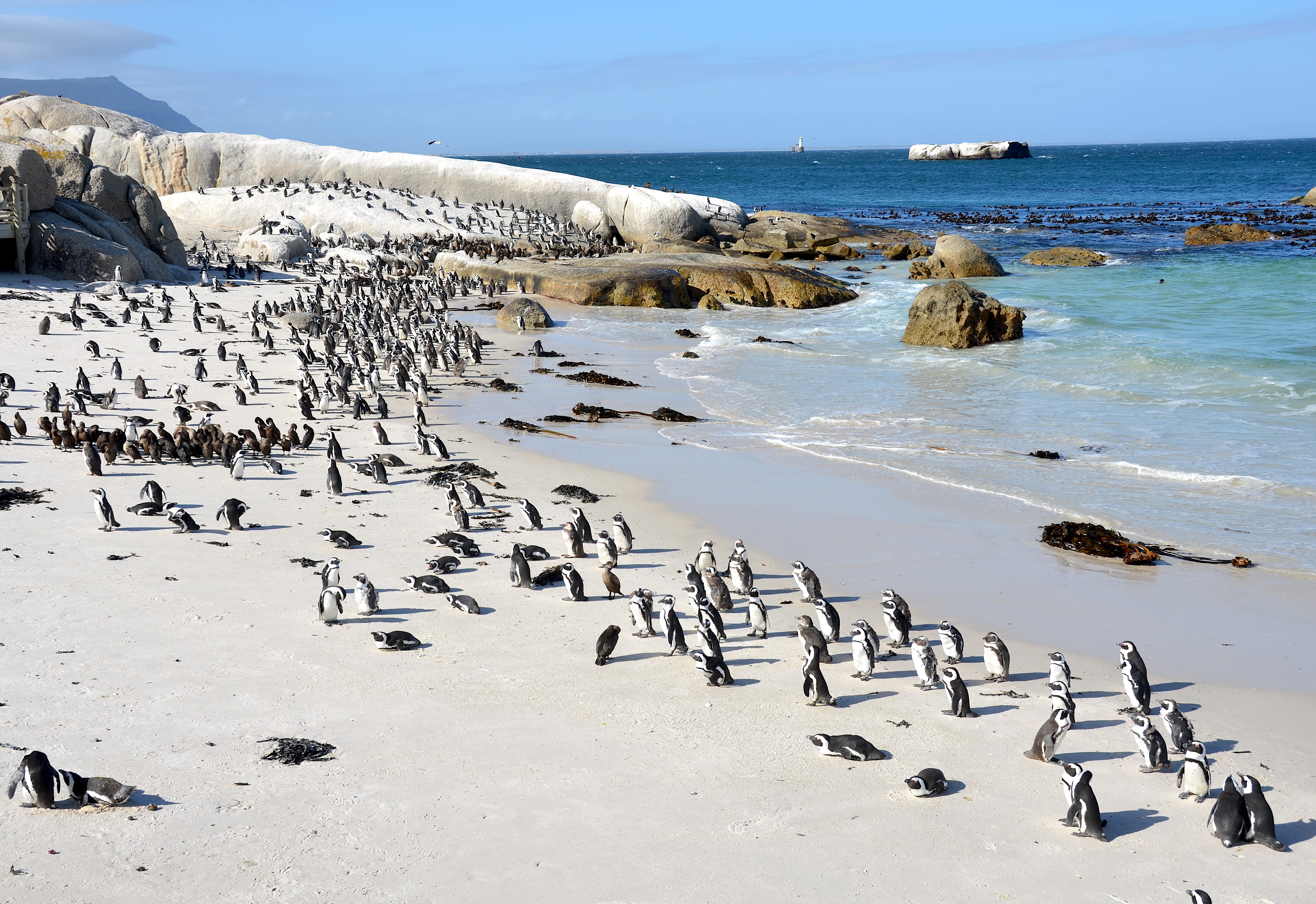
African penguins (Spheniscus demersus) on Boulders Beach

Boulders Beach is located a few kilometres to the south of Simon's Town, in the direction of Miller's Point. Here small coves and beaches are interspersed between boulders of Cape granite. There has been a colony of African penguins at Boulders Beach since 1982.

There is no record of the birds having lived here prior to that date. They are shown, with scenes from the town, in the 2021 series, Penguin Town. There are only three penguin populations on the mainland in southern Africa; the others are close to Hermanus at Stoney Point and Betty's Bay.

=== Martello Tower ===
In the last weeks of 1795 or the first weeks of 1796, the British built a round tower on a site that today falls within the Naval Base. Britain had just annexed the Dutch colony at the Cape of Good Hope and wanted to establish some defences to ward off possible Dutch or French attacks.

The resulting tower was 8 metres (26 ft) high, had a base diameter of 13 m (42 ft), and walls 1.8 m (6 ft) thick, though there is no evidence that the British ever installed the guns the tower was designed to hold. In front of the tower, the British also constructed a battery that they did arm with cannons. The Martello tower was used as a navigational beacon for ships entering Simon's Bay and was consequently white-washed in about 1843.

The tower was restored in 1972 by the Simon's Town Historical Society (in conjunction with the South African Navy), and proclaimed a provincial heritage site; today it houses a small museum.

=== South African Naval Museum ===
The South African Naval Museum is a maritime museum, which contains collections and artefacts related to the maritime history of South Africa and the South African Navy.

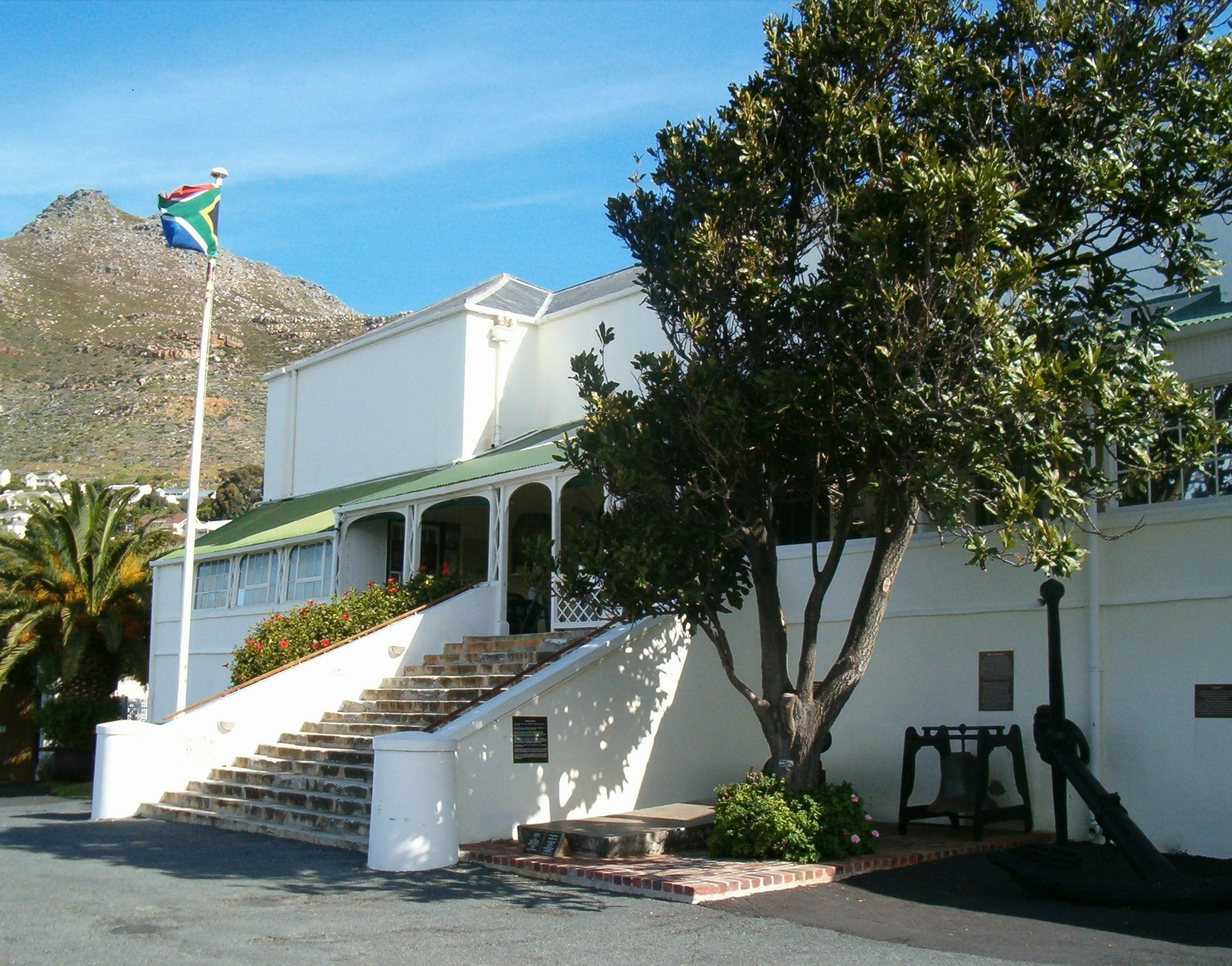
The Simon's Town Museum

=== Simon's Town Museum ===
Simon's Town Museum is a community museum established in 1977 and located in The Residency, a historical building erected by Governor Joachim van Plettenberg in 1777. The museum records and preserves all aspects of the history of Simon's Town community.

=== Simon's Town Heritage Museum ===
Simon's Town Heritage Museum is a house museum established by Zainab Davidson after the Amlay family home was returned following apartheid. After Davidson's retirement, nephew Sheribeen Amlay took over the running of the museum. Collections include photographs, newspapers, artifacts, ephemera, and genealogical resources for the inhabitants of Simon's Town pre-apartheid. Significant collections include those related to the history of Muslim settlement in the region.

=== Simon's Town Library ===
Simon's Town Library is situated in the former Simon's Town High School building that was designed and built in 1896 by architect (& later mayor of Cape Town) John Parker.

=== Public art ===
In 1985, a statue of Just Nuisance, the only dog ever to be officially enlisted in the Royal Navy, was erected in a position overlooking the harbour. The Simon's Town Museum has an exhibition dedicated to his story.

== Notable inhabitants ==
- Georgia Papageorge, installation artist
- Hendrik Vermeulen, couturier
- Simon Peyton Jones, computer scientist born in (and named after) Simonstown

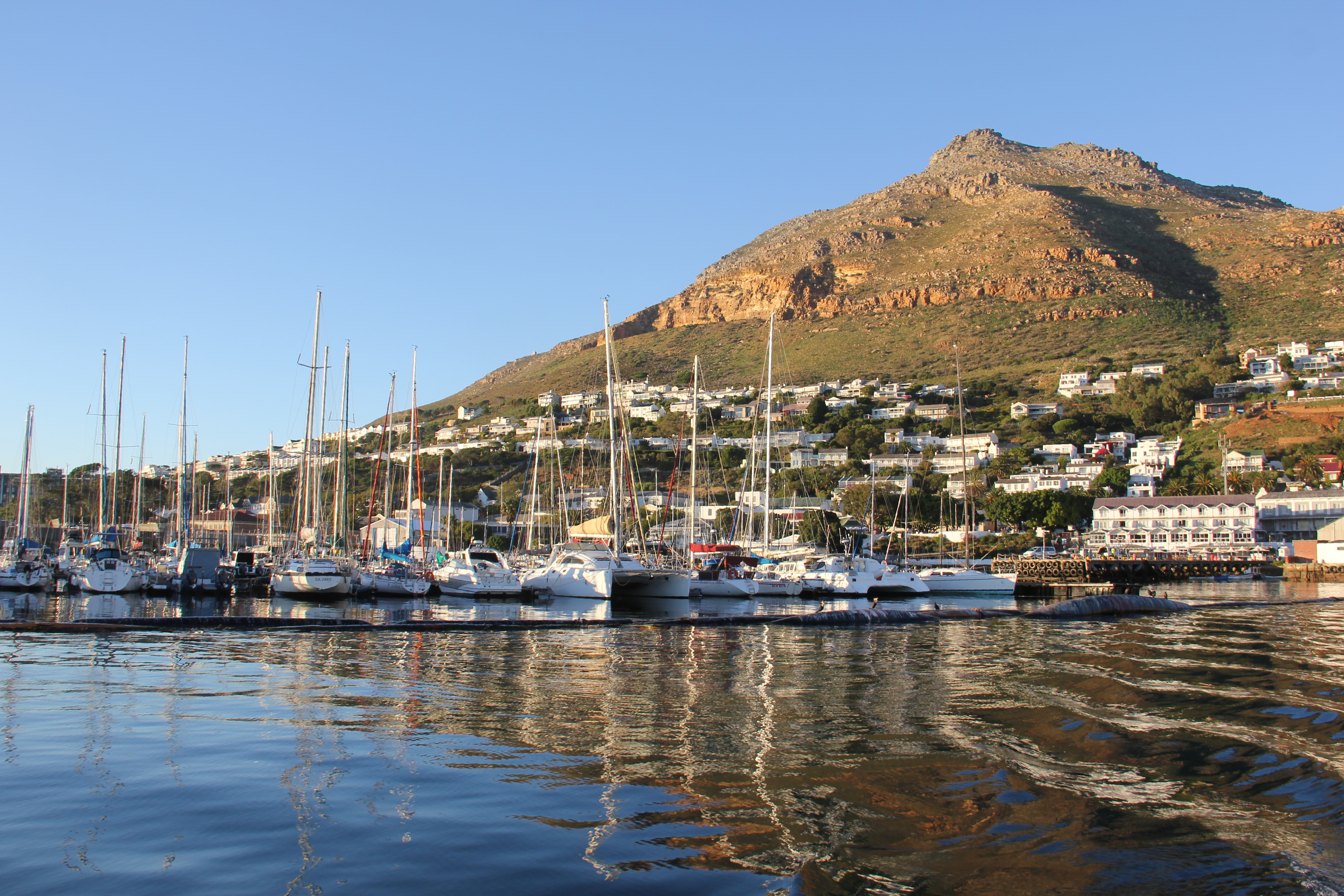
Simon's Town harbour

== Economy ==
Although Simon's Town has sometimes been described as a "free port," it was in fact declared a free warehousing port in April 1832 — a distinct and narrower customs classification from the unrestricted "free port" status granted to Port Elizabeth at the same time — and that designation reflected colonial-era naval and customs arrangements rather than an ongoing commercial free-trade status.

Since the Simonstown Agreement and the formal transfer of the naval base to South African control in 1957, the site has functioned primarily as Naval Base Simon's Town, the headquarters of the South African Navy, and is administered for naval purposes rather than routine commercial shipping.

Contemporary port directories list the harbour under UN/LOCODE ZASMN and describe it as a dockyard/naval harbour rather than an active commercial terminal, indicating limited or no routine commercial terminal operations; nearby commercial ports such as Cape Town and Saldanha Bay serve the region's commercial shipping needs.

While the harbour accommodates recreational and visiting yachts through the local marina and yacht club, such civilian berthing is managed under marina arrangements and naval access controls and does not indicate routine commercial port operations.

== Coat of arms ==
The Simon's Town municipal council assumed a coat of arms, designed by Adelbert Bonn, in September 1905. It was granted by the College of Arms on 27 September 1957.

The design is described as Quarterly: I and IV, per pale, the dexter Argent, three towers placed 2 and 1 Gules, the sinister per fess Or and Azure, in chief on a mount Vert a peacock in his pride proper and in base three plates placed 2 and 1 Argent; II and III, Azure, an estoile and in chief three crescents Argent; over all an oval cartouche with scrolled edges Or, charged with a demi-lion rampant Gules, issuant from three barrulets wavy Vert.

In layman's terms, the shield is divided into four quarters. The first quarter is divided vertically, one half depicting three red towers on a silver background, the other a peacock on a gold background above three silver discs on a red background; the second quarter is blue, with three silver crescents at the top and a wavy star below on a blue background; the third quarter is the same as the second and the fourth the same as the first; in the centre is an oval with a decorative edge displaying a red lion emerging from wavy green stripes on a golden background.

These were a slightly modified version of the arms of Willem Adriaan van der Stel, which Bonn mistakenly thought were those of his father Simon van der Stel.

The crest was the figure of Britannia resting on a golden naval crown. Two golden anchors were placed behind the shield. The motto was Fac et spera.

When the municipality was dissolved in 1996, the council placed its regalia, including the letters patent from the College of Arms, in the custody of the Simon's Town Historical Society. The society registered the arms in its own name at the Bureau of Heraldry in October 1999.

== Gallery ==
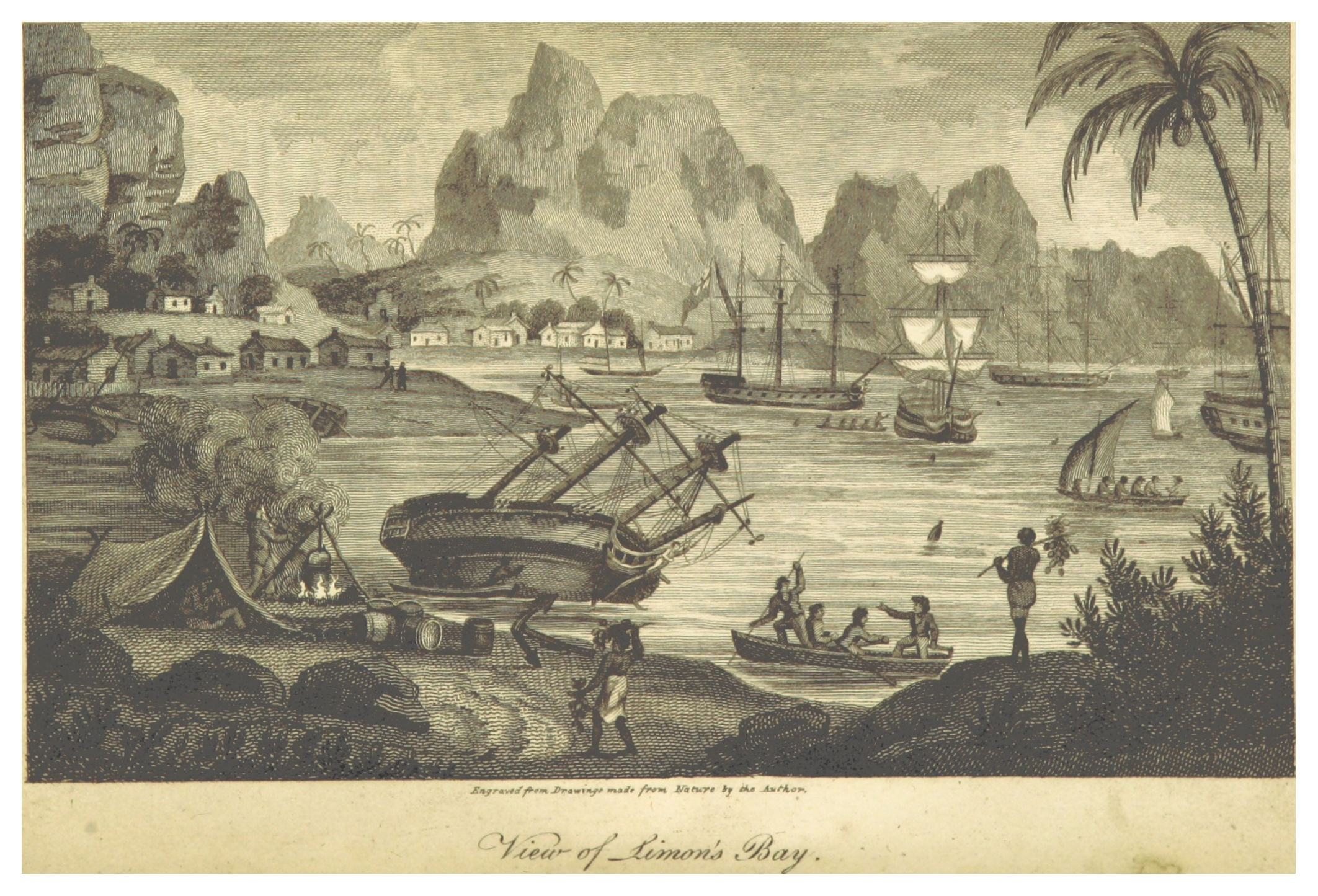
Simon's Bay - Naval Base, 1806

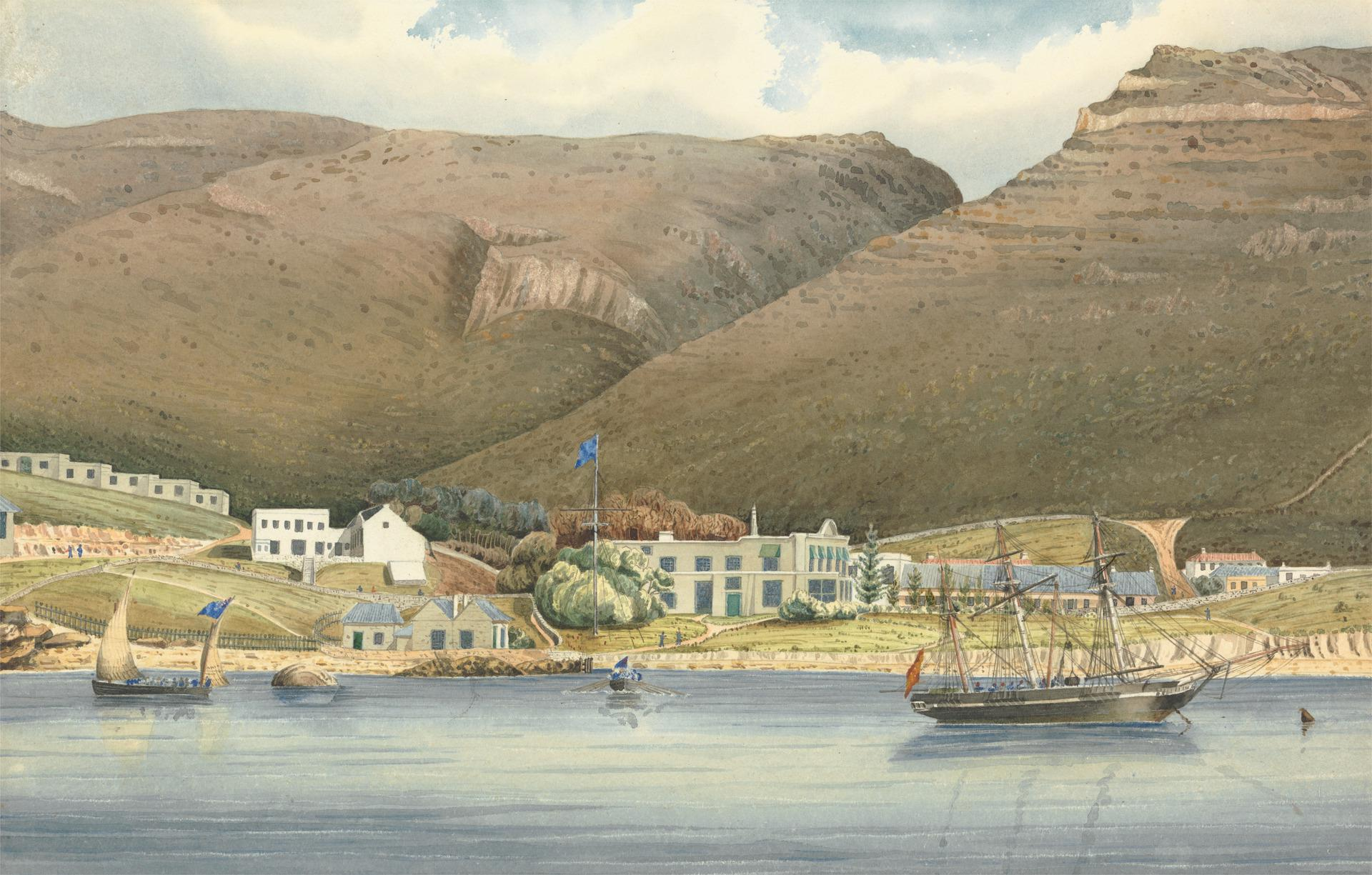
The Admiral House, Simon's Town, Cape of Good Hope, 1844

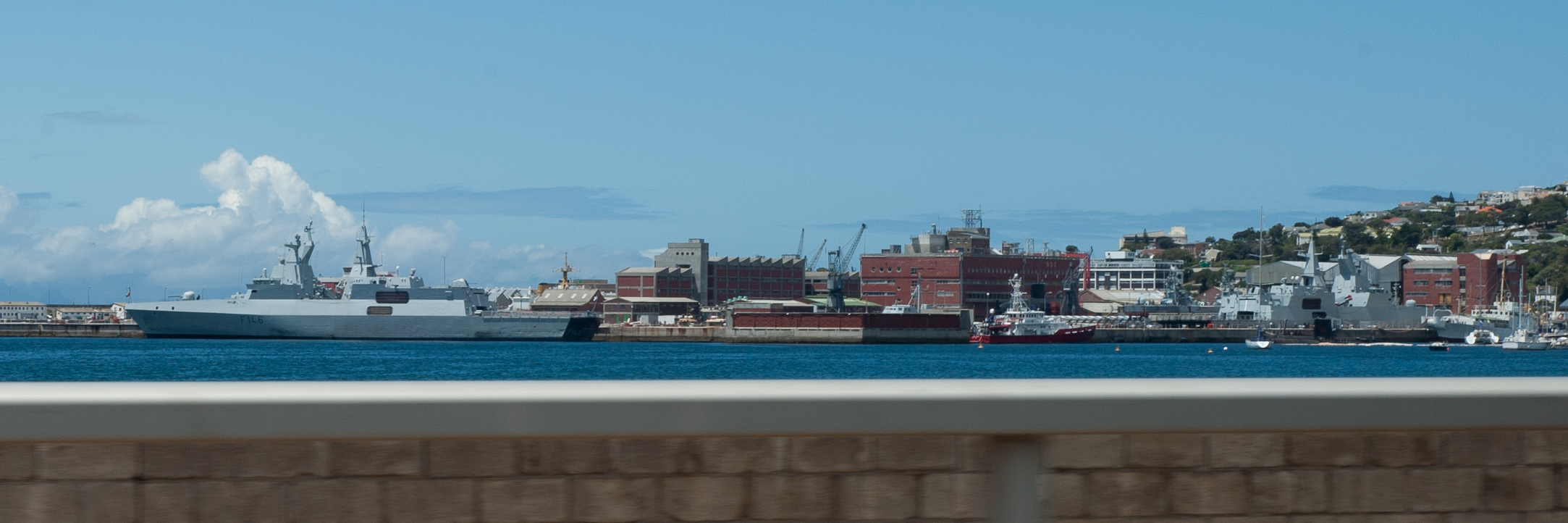
The South African Naval Base in Simon's Town.

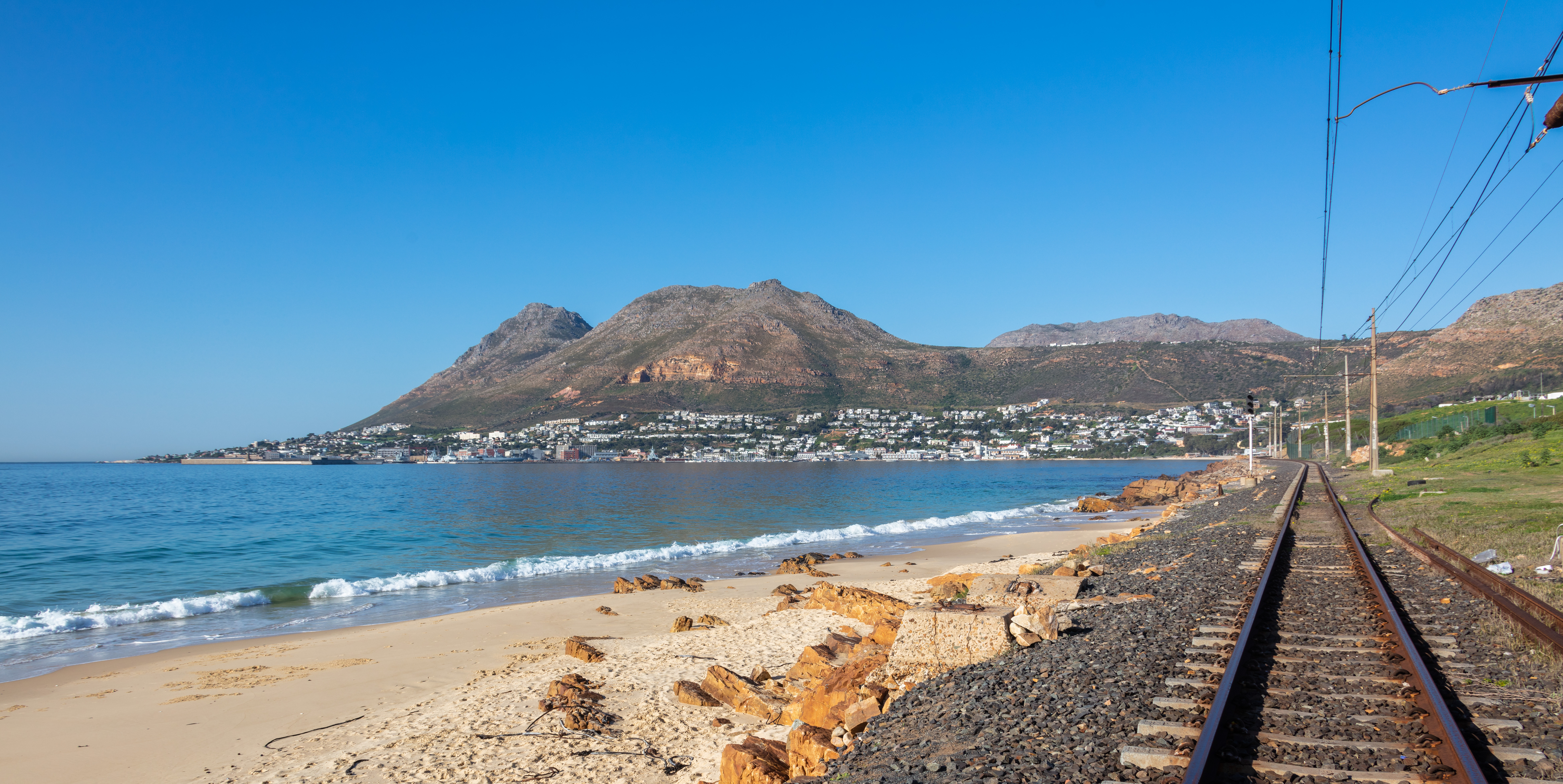
View of the bay from the railway line.

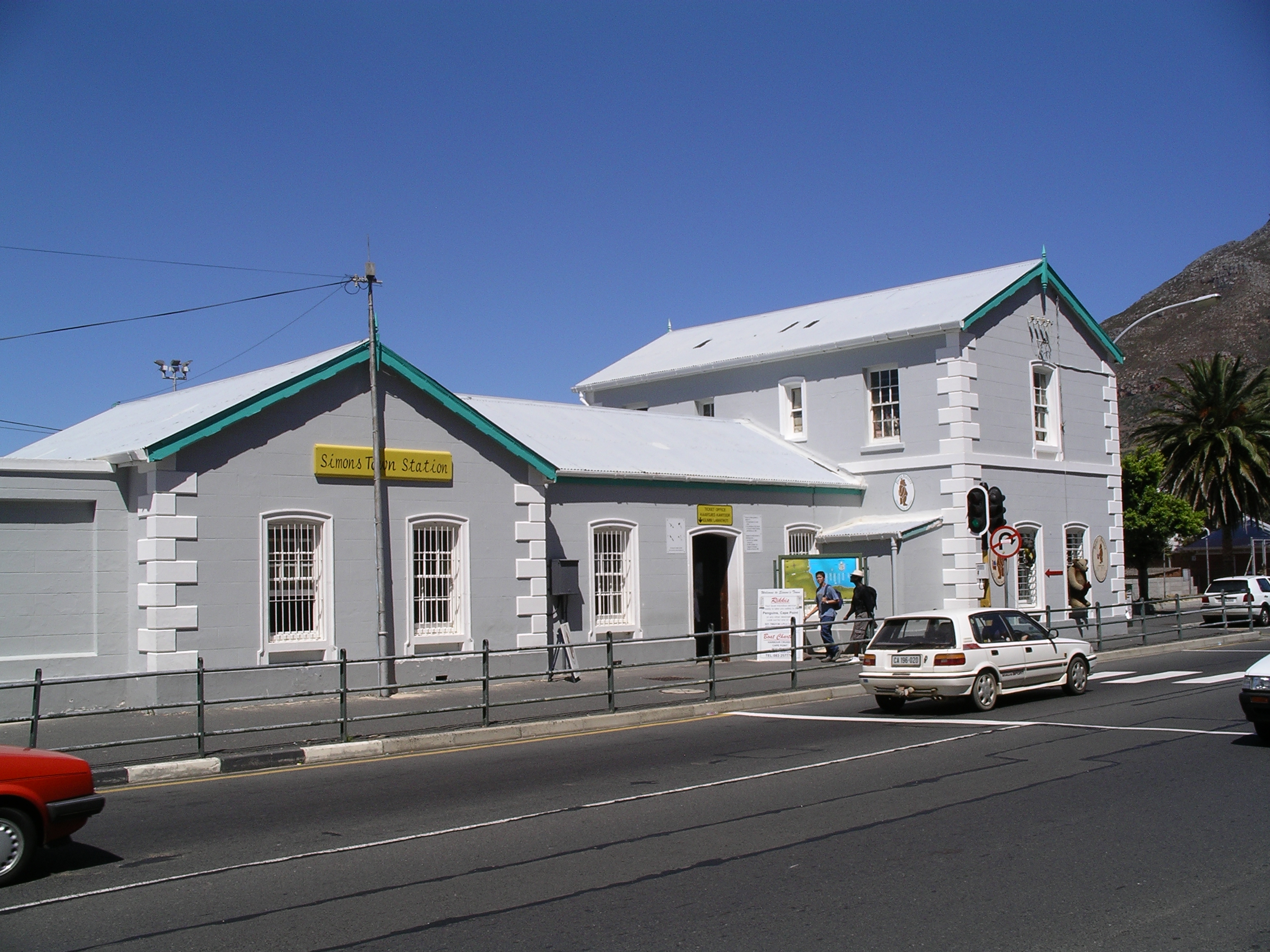
Simon's Town station

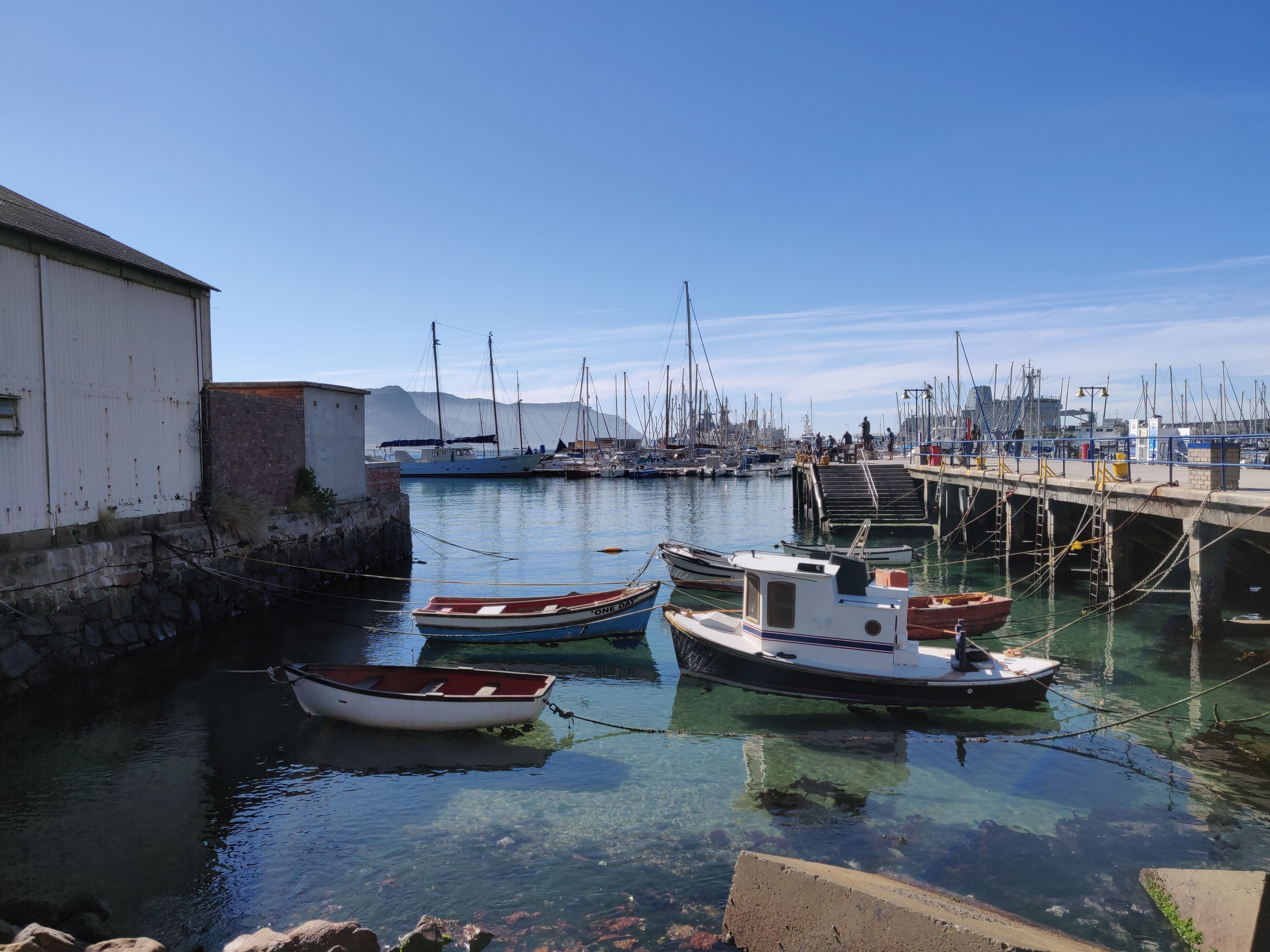
Boats in Simon's Town harbour.

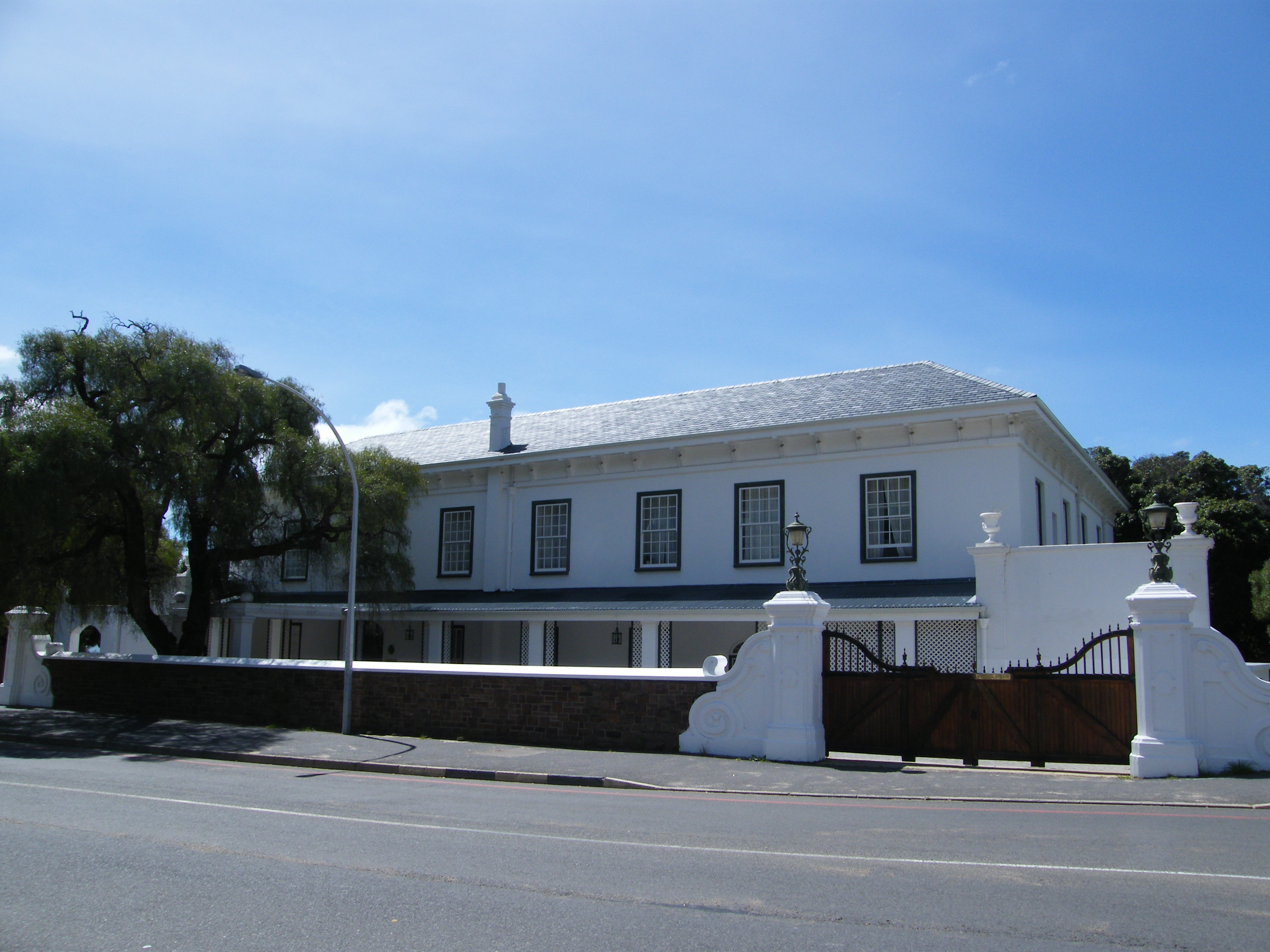
Admiralty House

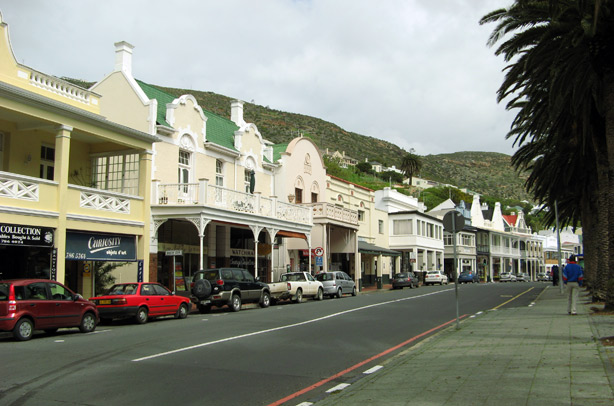
The historical centre of Simon's Town

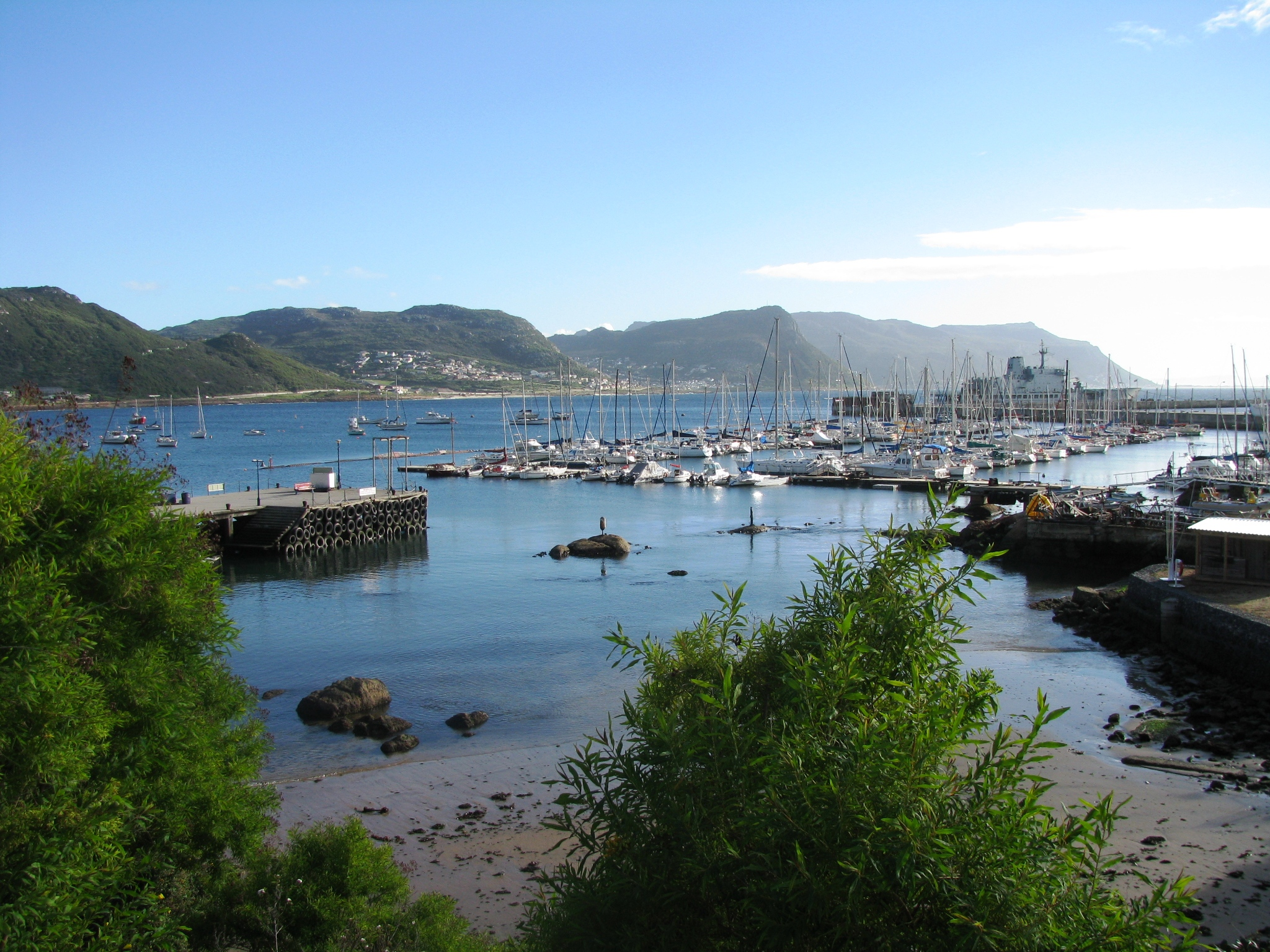
View of the harbour with the civilian yacht moorings in the foreground and the naval base to the right in the background.

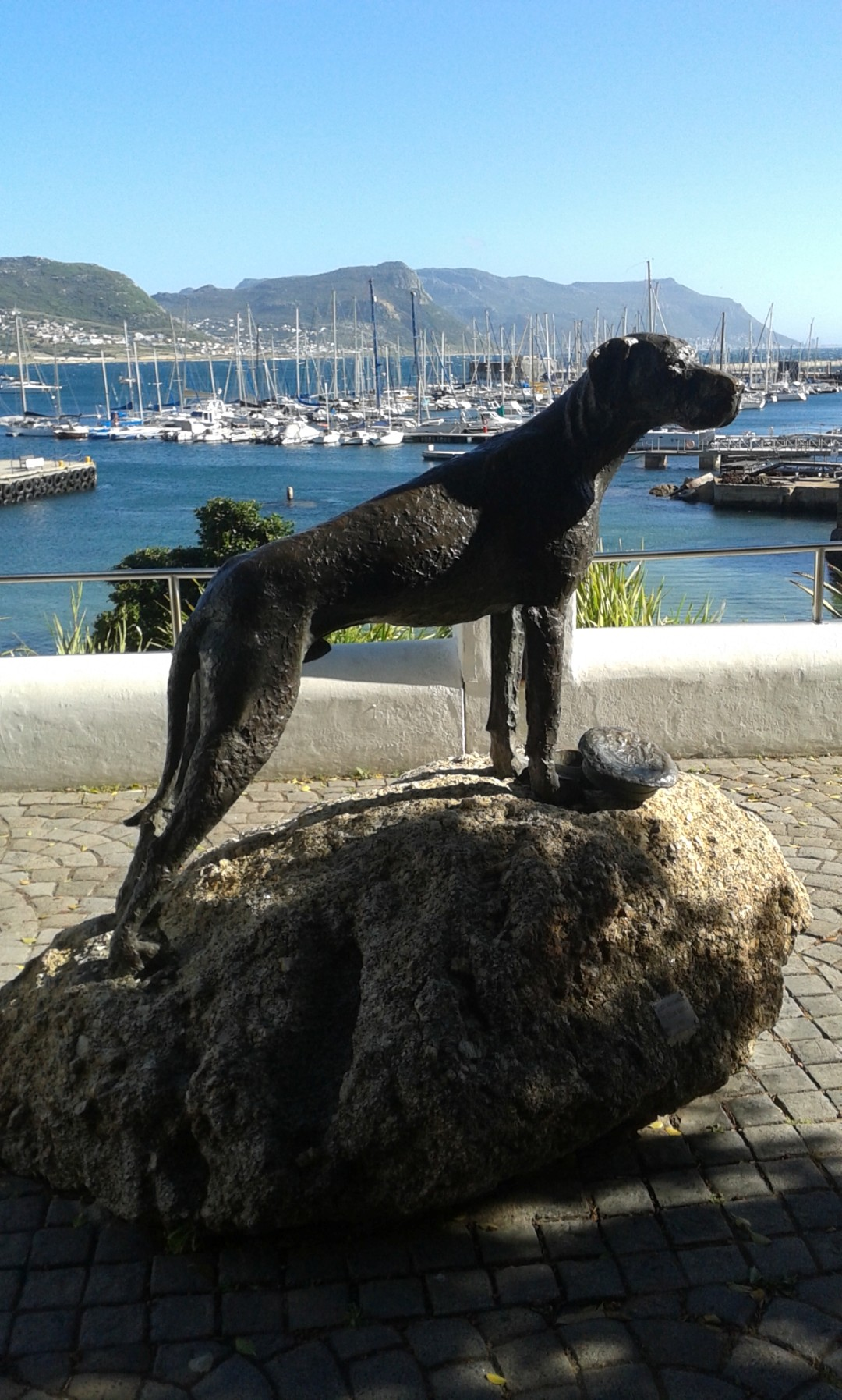
Statue of Just Nuisance in Simon's Town.

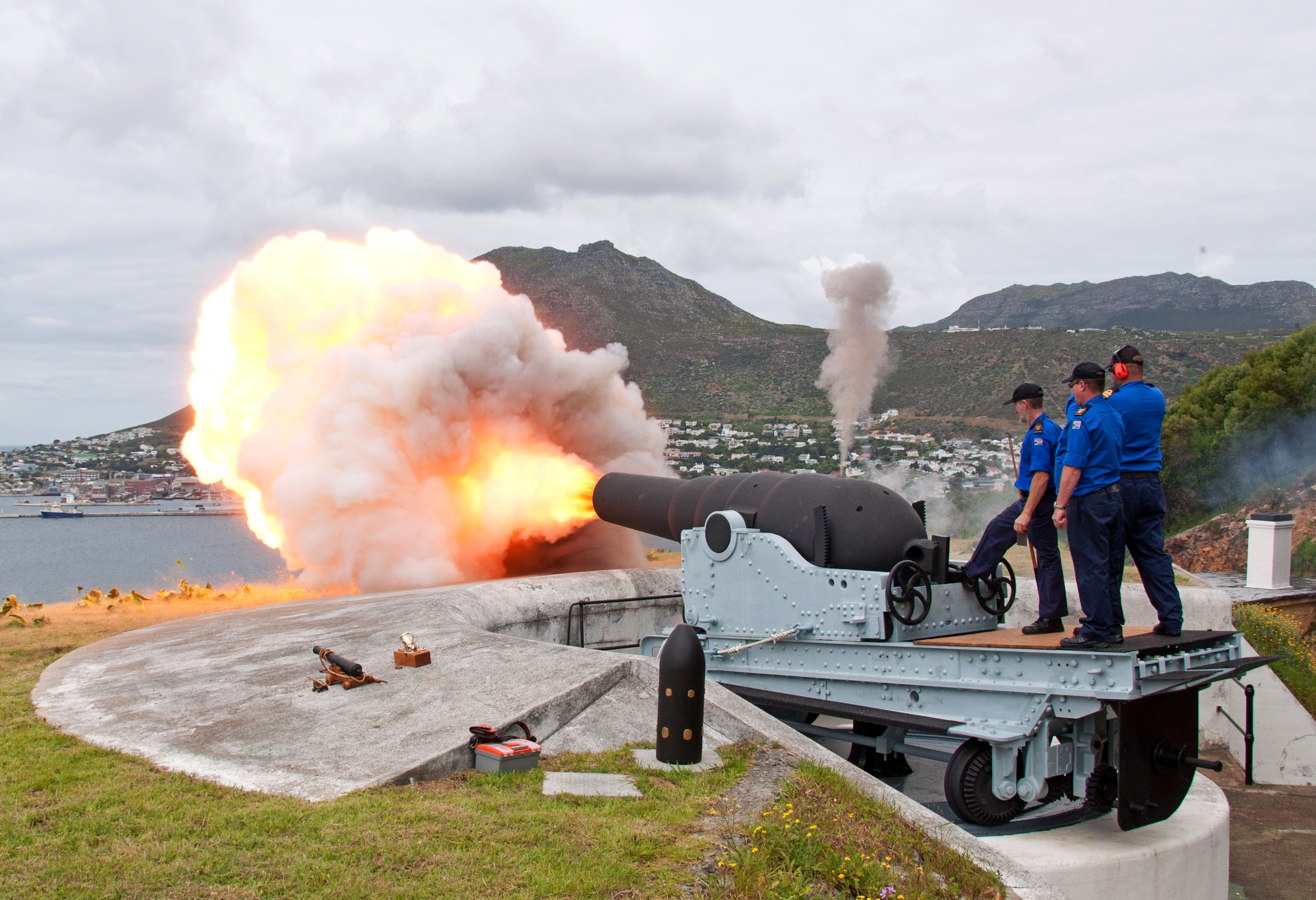
A restored 9 Inch MLR Gun being fired at the Middle North Battery overlooking the town.

A flight around Roman Rock Lighthouse just outside Simon's Town harbour.

== See also ==
- List of heritage sites in Simonstown – Sites recognised by SAHRA
- Simonstown Agreement – Naval cooperation agreement between the UK and South Africa
- Selborne Graving Dock – Dry dock in Simon's Town naval base, Western Cape, South Africa
- Roman Rock Lighthouse – Lighthouse in False Bay, near Simon's Town, South Africa
