= DSO =

DSO may refer to:

== Organisations ==
- Defence Science Organisation, now known as DSO National Laboratories, Singapore
- Defense Sciences Office, part of the US Defense Advanced Research Projects Agency
- Directorate of Special Operations, a South African law-enforcement agency
- Direct service organisation, a business unit of a United Kingdom local authority
- Groupe DSO, an Australian headquartered business cooperative

== Orchestras ==
- Dallas Symphony Orchestra
- Denver Symphony Orchestra
- Detroit Symphony Orchestra
- Diablo Swing Orchestra
- Dubuque Symphony Orchestra, in Dubuque, Iowa
- Darwin Symphony Orchestra, in Darwin, Northern Territory, Australia
- Deutsches Symphonie-Orchester Berlin, in Berlin, Germany
- Dubrovnik Symphony Orchestra, in Dubrovnik, Croatia
- Dark Star Orchestra, in Chicago, Illinois, United States
- Dunedin Symphony Orchestra, New Zealand

== Technology ==
- Digital sampling oscilloscope, samples measurements and displays or stores them
- Digital storage oscilloscope, which stores and analyses the signal digitally
- Direct sparse odometry, a machine vision algorithm for simultaneous localization and mapping
- Dynamic shared object, in computing
- Drakensang Online, the online computer game

== Astronomy ==
- Dark Sky Observatory, Appalachian State University (ASU) facility
- Deep-sky object, in astronomy

== Other uses ==
- Distinguished Service Order (disambiguation), several decorations
- Dark Star Orchestra, a Grateful Dead cover band formed in Chicago, Illinois
- Diablo Swing Orchestra, a Swedish avant-garde metal band
- Digital switchover
- Dental service organizations
- Days sales outstanding, in accountancy and finance
- Direct shipping ore, iron ore that can be shipped directly to a steel furnace
- Distribution system operators, in energy systems
- Diving safety officer, an administrator of United States university's research diving safety program
- Defensive Systems Officer, a member of the flight crew responsible for defensive systems
- Dubai Silicon Oasis, a free-trade zone in Dubai
- Dobbertin Surface Orbiter, an amphibious vehicle
- Domestic security officer serving as riot police
- Sondok Airport, IATA airport code
