= Sagaren Pillay =

Rear Admiral Sagaren Pillay SM MMM
- Military career
- Allegiance: South Africa
- Branch: South African Navy
- Service years: 1977–2018
- Rank: Rear Admiral
- Nickname: Sarge
- Commands: Chief Director: Maritime Strategy; FOC Naval Base Simon's Town
- Awards: Southern Cross Medal SM Military Merit Medal MMM General Service Medal (South Africa) Unitas (Unity) Medal Medalje vir Troue Diens (Medal for Loyal Service) Good Service Medal

Sagaren Pillay SM MMM SAN is a retired South African Navy officer, who served as Chief Director: Maritime Strategy.

== Military career ==
He has served a Naval Attache in Argentina, Flag Officer Commanding Naval Base Simon's Town and Director: Maritime Plans.

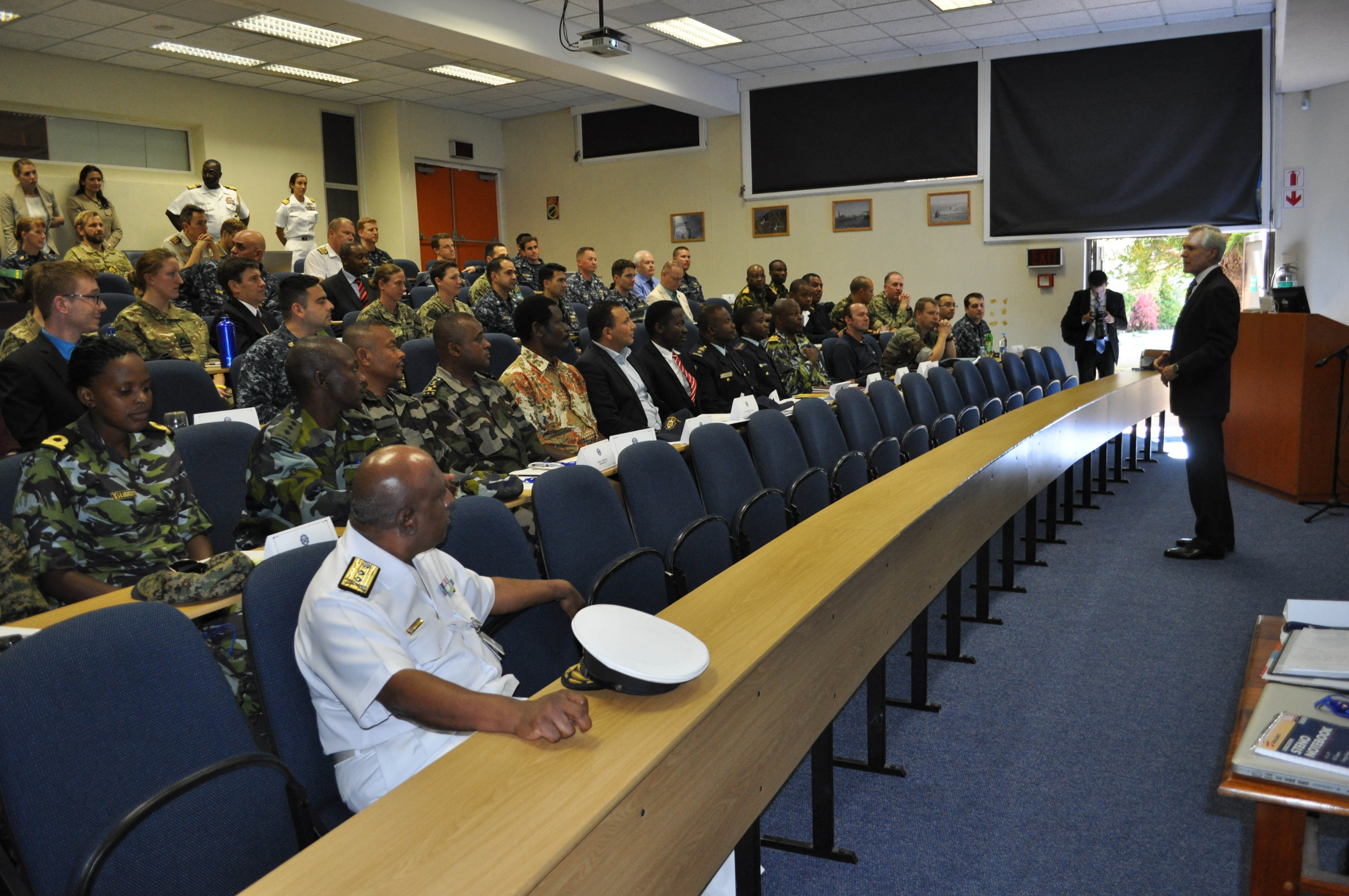
Rear Admiral Pillay listening to SECNAV Ray Mabus

He retired in 2018.

== Awards and decorations ==
- Southern Cross Medal (1975) (SM)
- Military Merit Medal (MMM)
- General Service Medal (South Africa)
- Unitas (Unity) Medal
- Medalje vir Troue Diens (Medal for Loyal Service) (30 Year Clasp)
- Good Service Medal (Silver (20 Years))
- Good Service Medal (Bronze (10 Years))

Military offices
Preceded by Hanno Teuteberg	Chief Director: Maritime Strategy; 2011-2018	Succeeded by David Mkhonto
