= Rolf Hauter =

Officer, chief

Rear Admiral Rolf Hauter PG SM MMM
- Born: Rolf Alfred; 25 December 1951 (age 74); Germany
- Spouse: Helgar Hauter
- Military career
- Allegiance: South Africa
- Branch: South African Navy
- Service years: 1970–2007
- Rank: Rear Admiral
- Unit: SAS Jan van Riebeeck
- Commands: Chief Director Strategy and Planning (SANDF); Chief of Military Policy Strategy Planning; Director Planning; OC South African Naval College
- Conflicts: Border War
- Awards: iPhrothiya yeGolide PG Southern Cross Medal SM Military Merit Medal MMM Pro Patria Medal Southern Africa Medal General Service Medal (South Africa) Unitas (Unity) Medal Good Service Medal Order of Naval Merit

Rear Admiral Rolf Hauter PG SM MMM (born 25 December 1951 as Rolf Alfred) is a retired South African Navy officer who served as Chief Director Strategy and Planning.

== Military career ==
He joined the Navy in 1970 and in 1974 earned a BMil degree at the South African Military Academy. He completed the Naval Senior Command Staff course in 1984. OC SAS Windhoek from 1987 to 1988 spending 273 days at sea. SSO Productivity Improvement at Navy HQ with promotion to Naval captain in 1989. Naval Attaché to Argentina during 1990 to 1992. He commanded the South African Naval College from 1993 to 1996. He was promoted to Commodore on 1 January 1998. Director Planning at the Policy & Planning Division. Chief Director Military Policy and Strategy at Corporate Staff Division on 1 January 2000 with promotion to rear admiral, in 2005 he was transferred to Navy HQ as Chief Director Maritime Strategy, a post he occupied until 2009 when he retired from the SANDF.

He retired in 2007.

== Awards and decorations ==
- iPhrothiya yeGolide (Golden Protea) (PG)
- Southern Cross Medal (1975) (SM)
- Military Merit Medal (MMM)
- Pro Patria Medal
- Southern Africa Medal
- General Service Medal (South Africa)
- Unitas (Unity) Medal
- Good Service Medal (Gold (30 Years))
- Good Service Medal (Silver (20 Years))
- Good Service Medal (Bronze (10 Years))
- Order of Naval Merit (Grand Officer) (Note: Portuguese: Ordem do Mérito Naval - Grande-Oficial) (Brazil)

== Notes ==
Military offices
Preceded by Phillip Schoultz	Chief Director Maritime Strategy; 2005–2009	Succeeded by Bernhard Teuteberg
Unknown	Chief of Military Policy, Strategy & Planning; 2003–2004	Succeeded by Vejaynand Ramlakan
Preceded by Anthony Howell	OC South African Naval College; 1993–1996	Succeeded by Bernhard Teuteberg
