= Patrick Duze =

South African Navy officer

Patrick Thamsanqua Duze
- Born: 19 October 1957 (age 68); Athlone, Cape Town
- Military career
- Allegiance: South Africa
- Branch: South African Navy
- Service years: 1994 - date
- Rank: Rear Admiral (JG)
- Commands: Director Fleet Force Preparation; SAS Wingfield

Rear Admiral (Junior Grade) Patrick Duze (born Athlone, 19 October 1957) is a South African Navy officer currently serving as Director Force Preparation at the Joint Operations Division

He went to school at Gugulethu and Langa High before becoming in student politics. He was detained between 1976 and 1978 in Pretoria Central Prison. In 1986 he left the country and returned in May 1992. He enrolled for an electrical engineering course but left to join the Navy on integration of the forces in 1994.

He took over the command of SAS Wingfield in February 2000.

He served as Chief of Fleet Staff at Fleet Command from January 2006 to April 2007 before being appointed Director Naval Policy and Doctrine.

He became the General Officer Commanding of the South African National War College in 2011.

He is due to retire voluntarily on 31 March 2017.

== Awards and decorations ==
- Decoration for Merit (Gold) (DMG)
- Merit Medal (Silver) (MMS)
- Merit Medal (Bronze) (MMB)
- Unitas (Unity) Medal
- Medalje vir Troue Diens (Medal for Loyal Service) (30 Year Clasp)
- Good Service Medal (Silver (20 Years))
- Service Medal (Bronze)

Military offices
Unknown	Director Joint Force Preparation, J Ops; 2014-2017	Succeeded by Gustav Lategan
Preceded by SD Mashobane	Commandant SA National War College; 2011-2013	Succeeded by Siseko Nombewu
Preceded by Koos Louw	Chief of Fleet Staff; 2006-2007	Succeeded by Robert W. Higgs
