= David Mkhonto =

Vice Admiral David Maningi Mkhonto
- Born: May 5, 1969 (age 57); Mbuzini, Mpumalanga
- Military career
- Allegiance: South Africa
- Branch: DOD Logistics Division
- Service years: 1994–date
- Rank: Vice Admiral
- Commands: Chief Logistics: Department of Defence Logistics Division; Chief Director: Maritime Strategy; Director Fleet Logistics; Naval Base Simon's Town; Chief of Fleet Staff
- Awards: Operational Medal for Southern Africa South Africa Service Medal Unitas (Unity) Medal Medalje vir Troue Diens (Medal for Loyal Service) Good Service Medal

Vice Admiral David Maningi Mkhonto is a South African Naval officer, serving as the Department of Defence Chief Logistics.

== Military career ==
Adm Mkhonto joined Umkhonto we Sizwe (the military wing of the African National Congress) in 1988 and joined the Navy on integration in 1994. He is a qualified Mechanical Fitter Machinery Ships. He served aboard SAS Galeshewe and SAS Shaka.

Maningi started officer training in April 2000 and served as Assistant Project Officer for WILLIS in Germany. In February 2009, after attending the South African National War College in Tshwane, he was appointed as Officer Commanding Fleet Maintenance Unit Simon's Town, reporting to Director Fleet Logistics, from 1 January 2010.

Adm Mkhonto was appointed as Flag Officer Commanding on 1 April 2012 before being appointed Director Fleet Logistics in March 2015.

He took over as Chief Director Maritime Strategy on 1 April 2018.

== Awards and decorations ==
- Operational Medal for Southern Africa
- South Africa Service Medal
- Unitas (Unity) Medal
- Medalje vir Troue Diens (Medal for Loyal Service) (30 Year Clasp)
- Good Service Medal (Bronze (10 Years))

Military offices
Preceded by Koos Louw	FOC Naval Base Simon's Town; 2012–2015	Succeeded by Joseph Dlamini
Preceded by Monde Lobese	Director Fleet Logistics; 2015–2018	Succeeded by Papi Ikaneng
Preceded by Sagaren Pillay	Chief Director: Maritime Strategy; 2018–2024	Succeeded by Musawenkosi Nkomonde
Preceded by Xolani Ndlovu	Chief of Staff Logistics; 2024–	Incumbent
