= Leon Reeders =

Officer, chief

Rear Admiral Junior Grade Leon Olaf Reeders SM MMM
- Born: Harare
- Spouse: Pam
- Military career
- Allegiance: South Africa
- Branch: South African Navy
- Service years: 1969–2007
- Rank: Rear Admiral
- Unit: SAS Simon van der Stel
- Commands: OC Durban Dockyard; Director Naval Acquisition; OC South African Naval College
- Conflicts: Border War
- Awards: Southern Cross Medal SM Military Merit Medal MMM Pro Patria Medal Southern Africa Medal General Service Medal (South Africa) Unitas (Unity) Medal Good Service Medal

Rear Admiral Leon Reeders SM MMM is a retired South African Navy officer who served as Director Naval Acquisition.

== Military career ==
He joined the Navy in 1969 after matriculating from Pretoria Boys High School in 1968. He was trained at the Naval Gymnasium and the South African Naval College. He served as Bridge Watch keeping on the SAS Simon van der Stel, Assistant Departmental Officer and Watch Keeping Officer on the SAS President Kruger. He was commissioned in 1971. Gunnery Officer and First Lieutenant on SAS Walvis Bay. He completed the Diving course in 1973 and served as Anti Submarine Warfare Officer on the SAS Jan van Riebeeck. OC SAS Fleur and promoted to rank of lieutenant at this time. Project officer to the Strike Craft Acquisition project in mid 1977. Executive Officer on the SAS Jim Fouché. OC SAS Kobie Coetzee in 1982. Strike Craft Flotilla Personnel Officer in 1985 and completed the Naval Command Staff Course in 1987. SSO Maritime Operations at NAVCOM East in 1988. OC 1 Strike Craft Squadron in 1989–1991. Project Officer Project CALIBAN in January 1991. Captain Reeders completed the Joint Staff Course in 1995. OC Naval Base Durban and the Strike Craft Flotilla from 1996 to 1998. Defence Advisor to France, Belgium and The Netherlands from Dec 1998-Dec 2001. Director Naval Acquisition from 1 July 2001 until his retirement in 2007.

== Awards and decorations ==
- Southern Cross Medal (1975) (SM)
- Military Merit Medal (MMM)
- Pro Patria Medal
- Southern Africa Medal
- General Service Medal (South Africa)
- Unitas (Unity) Medal
- Good Service Medal (Gold (30 Years))
- Good Service Medal (Silver (20 Years))
- Good Service Medal (Bronze (10 Years))

Military offices
Preceded by Ockert van der Schyf	Director Naval Acquisition; 2002–2007	Succeeded by Alan Claydon-Fink
