= Koos Louw =

South African Navy officer

Rear Admiral (JG) Jacobus Everhardus Louw PG SM PS MMM SAN (Rtd)
- Born: 17 July 1952 (age 74)
- Military career
- Allegiance: South Africa
- Branch: South African Navy
- Service years: c. 1971–2012
- Rank: Rear Admiral (JG)
- Nickname: Koos
- Commands: Twice OC Naval Base Simon's Town; Chief of Fleet Staff
- Conflicts: Border War
- Awards: iPhrothiya yeGolide PG Southern Cross Medal SM iPhrothiya yeSiliva PS Military Merit Medal MMM Pro Patria Medal General Service Medal (South Africa) Unitas (Unity) Medal Medalje vir Troue Diens (Medal for Loyal Service) Good Service Medal Order of Naval Merit Tamandaré Medal of Merit Order of Prince Henry OIH

Rear Admiral Koos Louw PG PS SM MMM SAN (Rtd) (born 17 July 1952) is a retired South African Navy officer.

He served as Flag Officer Commanding Naval Base Simon's Town twice, first from 1 April 1999 to 31 March 2005 and again from November 2006 to July 2012.

He also served as Chief of Fleet Staff at Fleet Command (2005) and Director Fleet Logistics and retired in 2012.

An investigative report published in 1994 by The Mail & Guardian exposes Louw as a former member of an apartheid-era covert intelligence and assassination unit, the Directorate of Covert Collections (DCC).

== Honours and awards ==
- iPhrothiya yeGolide (Golden Protea) (PG)
- iPhrothiya yeSiliva (Silver Protea) (PS)
- Southern Cross Medal (1975) (SM)
- Military Merit Medal (MMM)
- Pro Patria Medal
- General Service Medal (South Africa)
- Unitas (Unity) Medal
- Medalje vir Troue Diens (Medal for Loyal Service) (40 Year Clasp)
- Good Service Medal (Gold (30 Years))
- Good Service Medal (Silver (20 Years))
- Good Service Medal (Bronze (10 Years))
- Order of Naval Merit (Grand Officer) (Note: Portuguese: Ordem do Mérito Naval - Grande-Oficial) (Brazil)
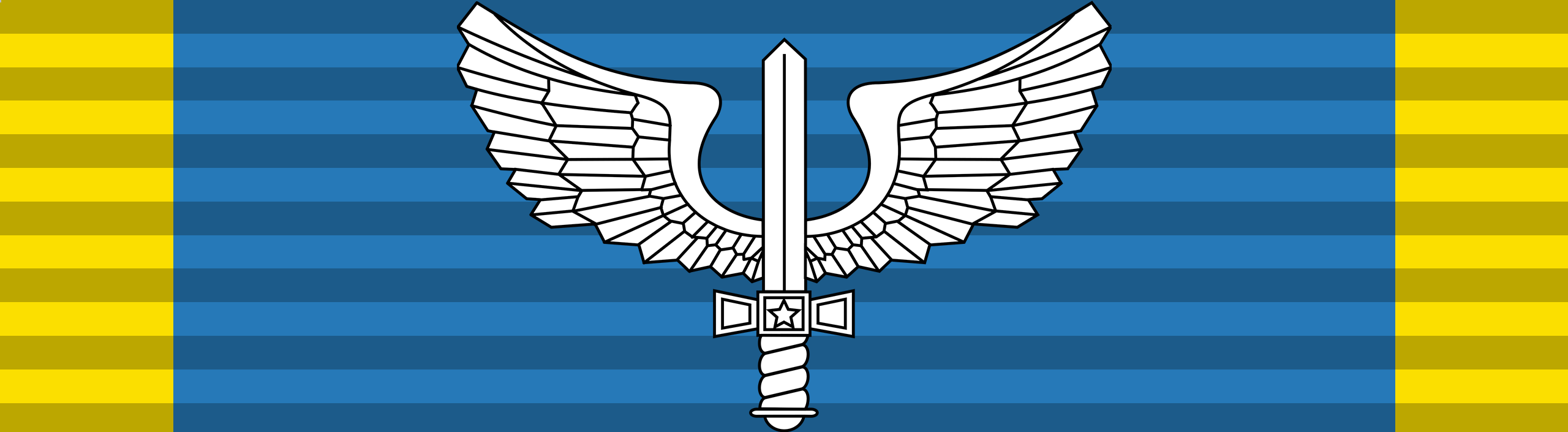
- Medal of Merit Santos Dumont (Brazil)
- Tamandaré Medal of Merit (Note: Portuguese: Medalha do Mérito Tamandaré) (Brazil)
- Legion of Honour (Officer) (Note: French: Légion d'honneur - Officier) (France)
- Order of Prince Henry (Officer - Oficial) (OIH) (Portugal)

In 2010 Louw was awarded the Order of Prince Henry by Portugal's ambassador to South Africa.

== Notes ==
Military offices
| Unknown | FOC Naval Base Simon's Town; 1 April 1999–31 March 2005 | Unknown |
| Unknown | Chief of Fleet Staff at Fleet Command; 2005 | Unknown |
| Unknown | Director Fleet Logistics; Unknown | Unknown |
| Unknown | FOC Naval Base Simon's Town; November 2006–July 2012 | Succeeded by R Adm (JG) David Maningi Mkhonto |
