= Phillip Schoultz =

South African Navy admiral

Rear Admiral Philip Schöultz SD SM MMM
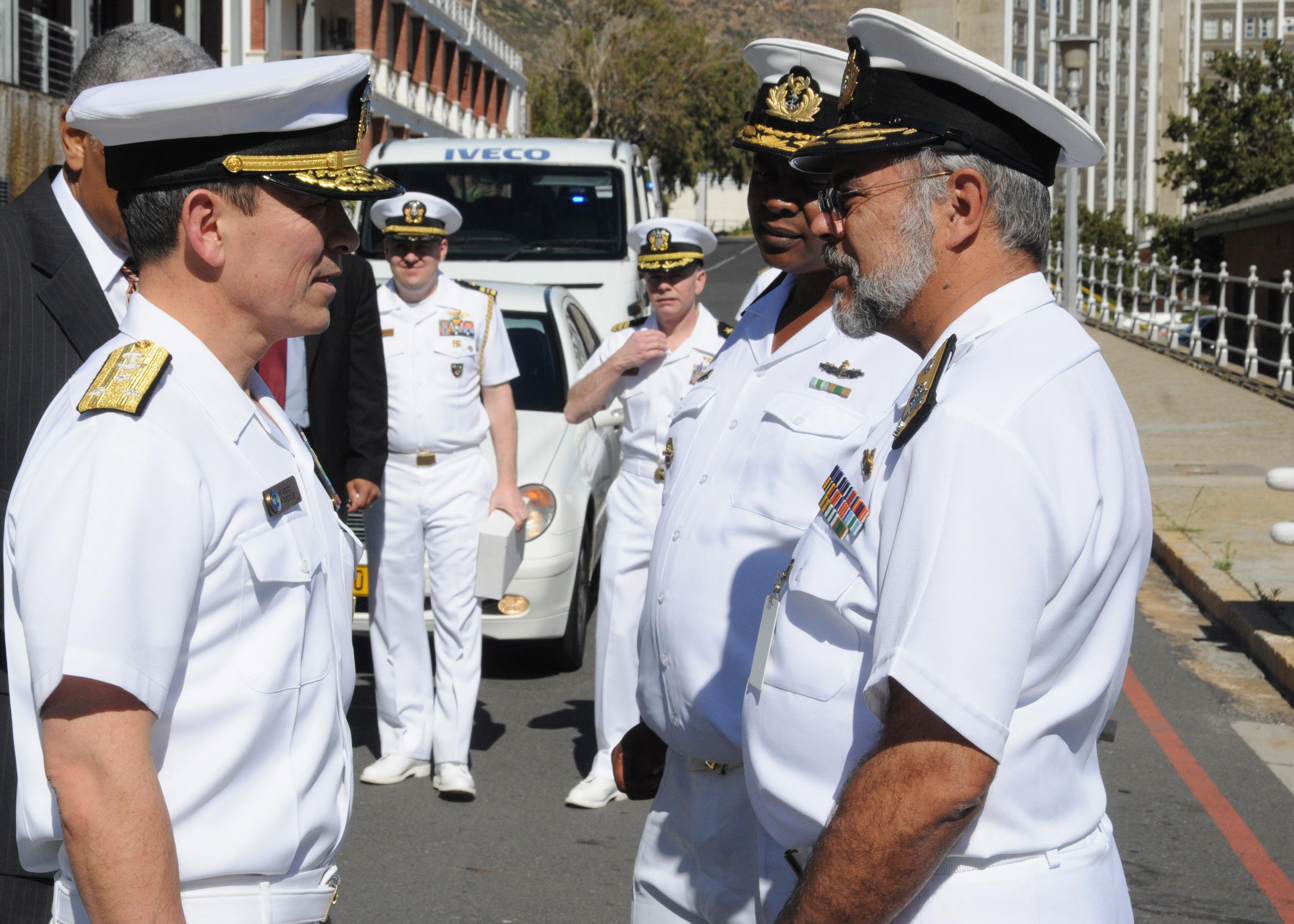
- Schöultz (right) meeting Harry B. Harris
- Military career
- Allegiance: South Africa
- Branch: South African Navy
- Service years: 1972–2014
- Rank: Rear Admiral
- Commands: Flag Officer Fleet; Director Joint Operations
- Awards: Southern Cross Decoration SD Southern Cross Medal SM Military Merit Medal MMM Pro Patria Medal Southern Africa Medal General Service Medal (South Africa) Unitas (Unity) Medal Medalje vir Troue Diens (Medal for Loyal Service) Good Service Medal

Rear Admiral Philip Schöultz SD SM MMM is a retired Rear Admiral in the South African Navy, who served as Flag Officer Fleet.

He joined the Navy in 1972 and served on minesweeper SAS Pretoria, the destroyer SAS Jan van Riebeeck, and the frigate SAS President Kruger. Later on, he joined the strikecraft flotilla, serving as weapons officer aboard the strike craft SAS Jan Smuts and as operations officer aboard SAS Hendrik Mentz before taking over command of SAS Oswald Pirow.

He served as SSO Personnel at the Strike Craft flotilla before being posted to Navy Headquarters in 1988. He also served as SSO Surface Warfare, Sub Surface Warfare, Director Maritime Plans and Chief Director Maritime Strategy at Naval Headquarters. He was promoted to rear admiral in January 2004.

Additionally, he served as Chief Director Operational Development at the Joint Operations division until 2011 when he was appointed Flag Officer Fleet.

== Honours and awards ==
He has been awarded the following:

- Southern Cross Decoration (SD)
- Southern Cross Medal (1975) (SM)
- Military Merit Medal (MMM)
- Pro Patria Medal
- Southern Africa Medal
- General Service Medal (South Africa)
- Unitas (Unity) Medal
- Medalje vir Troue Diens (Medal for Loyal Service) (40 Year Clasp)
- Good Service Medal (Gold (30 Years))
- Good Service Medal (Silver (20 Years))
- Good Service Medal (Bronze (10 Years))

He obtained a bachelor's degree in Military Sciences (BMil) at the Military Academy in 1975, and was awarded the Sword of Honour.

Military offices
Preceded by Robert W. Higgs	Flag Officer Fleet; 2010–2014	Succeeded by Bubele Mhlana
Preceded by	Chief Director Operational Development; 2005–2010	Succeeded by
Preceded by Anthony Howell	Chief Director Maritime Strategy; 2001–2005	Succeeded by Rolf Hauter
