= Robert W. Higgs =

South African Navy officer (born 1957)

Rear Admiral Robert William Higgs SM MMM SAN (Rtd)
- Born: 7 July 1957 (age 69); King Williams Town, Eastern Cape
- Spouse: Diana
- Military career
- Allegiance: South Africa
- Branch: South African Navy
- Service years: 1976–2016
- Rank: Rear Admiral
- Nickname: Rusty
- Commands: Chief of Naval Staff; Flag Officer Fleet; SAS Fleur
- Awards: Southern Cross Medal SM Military Merit Medal MMM Pro Patria Medal Southern Africa Medal General Service Medal (South Africa) Unitas (Unity) Medal Medalje vir Troue Diens (Medal for Loyal Service) Good Service Medal Order of Naval Merit Legion of Merit LOM Tamandaré Medal of Merit

Rear Admiral(ret) Robert William Higgs SM MMM SAN (Rtd) (7 July 1957, King Williams Town) is a former-South African Navy officer, who served as Chief of Naval Staff from 1 November 2010 to 31 August 2016.

== Military career ==
After matriculating from Grey High School in Port Elizabeth, he joined the Navy in 1976 as a midshipman, graduating from the South African Naval College in 1978 before attending the South African Military Academy, obtaining a BMil (BSc). He qualified as a mine clearance officer before commanding SAS Fleur.

He then qualified in submarines, becoming First Lieutenant on SAS Umkhonto (S98) (Formerly SAS Emily Hobhouse (S98)) in 1989 and Officer Commanding of the SAS Assegaai (Formerly SAS Johanna van der Merwe) in 1991.

In 1994 he became the first SA Navy officer to attend the US Naval War College. He then obtained a master's degree in International Relations from Salve Regina University in May 1996.

In 1996 he was promoted to captain, serving as the Director of Naval Force Planning and Director of Naval Strategy. In 1998 he was appointed the Naval attaché to Washington.

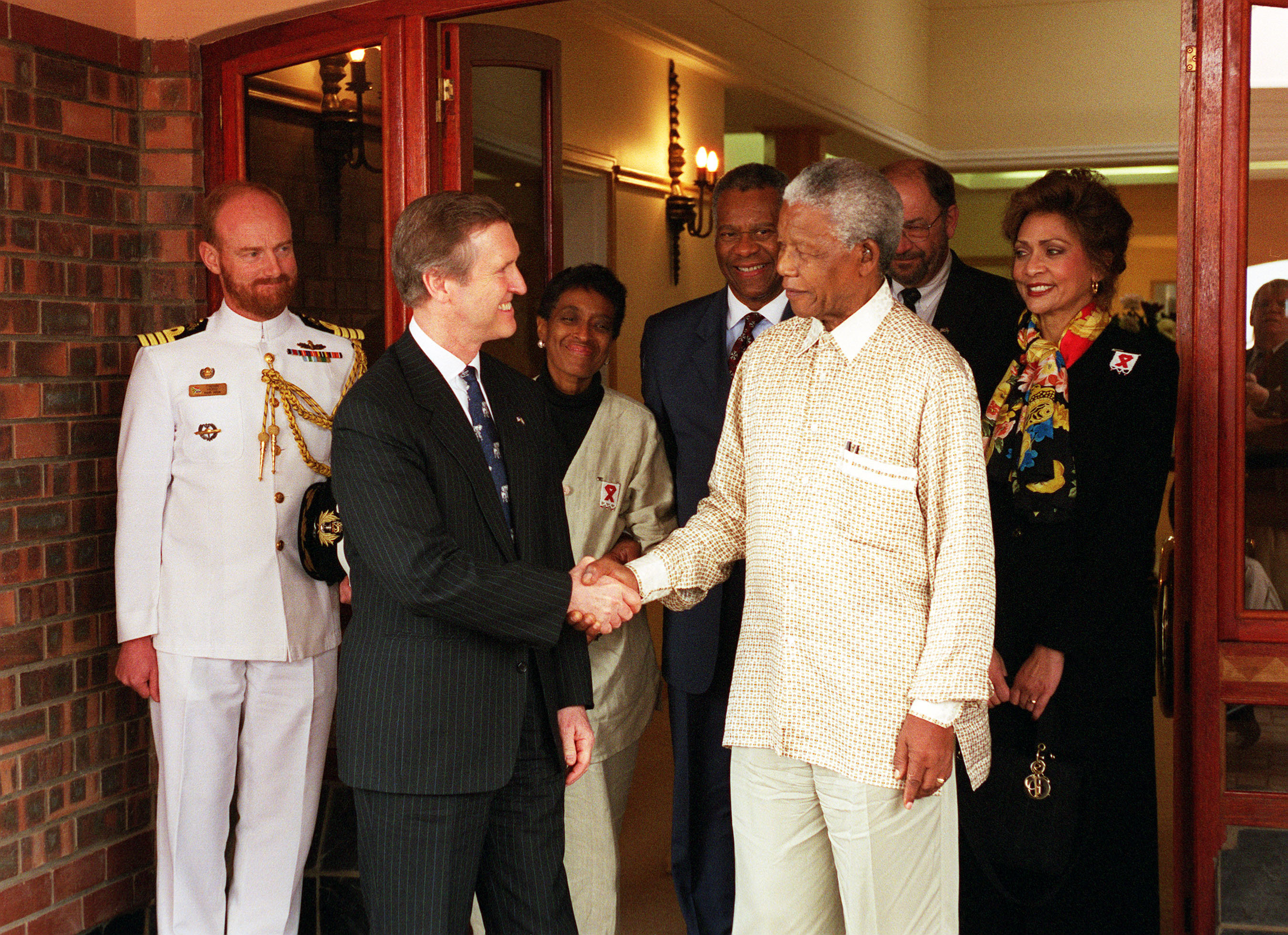
Higgs while Naval Attaché

In 2001 he was appointed as SSO Naval Career Management, followed by SSO Navy Public Relations.

In February 2005 he was promoted to rear admiral (jg) and appointed as Director of Maritime Warfare. He was appointed Chief of Fleet Staff in April 2007 before being appointed Flag Officer Fleet in April 2008 and promoted to rear admiral. On 1 November 2010 he became Chief of Naval Staff.

== Awards and decorations ==
- Southern Cross Medal (1975) (SM)
- Military Merit Medal (MMM)
- Pro Patria Medal
- Southern Africa Medal
- General Service Medal (South Africa)
- Unitas (Unity) Medal
- Medalje vir Troue Diens (Medal for Loyal Service) (30 Year Clasp)
- Good Service Medal (Silver (20 Years))
- Good Service Medal (Bronze (10 Years))
- Order of Naval Merit (Grand Officer) (Note: Portuguese: Ordem do Mérito Naval - Grande-Oficial) (Brazil)
- Legion of Merit (Officer) (LOM) (USA)
- Tamandaré Medal of Merit (Note: Portuguese: Medalha do Mérito Tamandaré) (Brazil)

== Notes ==
Military offices
Preceded by George Mphafi	Chief of Naval Staff; 2011–2016	Succeeded by Asiel Kubu
Preceded by Hennie Bester	Flag Officer Fleet; 2008–2011	Succeeded by Phillip Schoultz
Preceded by Patrick Duze	Chief of Fleet Staff; 2007–2008	Succeeded by Samuel Hlongwane
