= Alan Claydon-Fink =

South African admiral

Rear Admiral Junior Grade Alan S. Claydon-Fink MMM
- Military career
- Allegiance: South Africa
- Branch: South African Navy
- Service years: 19??–2016
- Rank: Rear Admiral (JG)
- Commands: Director Naval Acquisition
- Conflicts: Border War
- Awards: Military Merit Medal MMM Pro Patria Medal Southern Africa Medal General Service Medal (South Africa) Unitas (Unity) Medal Medalje vir Troue Diens (Medal for Loyal Service) Good Service Medal

Rear Admiral (Junior Grade) Alan Claydon-Fink MMM is a retired South African Navy officer who served as Director Naval Acquisition.

== Military career ==
He was a naval combat officer who had vast experience at sea and ashore. Capt (SAN) Claydon-Fink served as a Project Officer at Defence Acquisition & Procurement Division on the Special Defence Package Acquisition (Arms Deal) of the late 1990s. Director Naval Acquisition at Defence Materiel Division from 1 March 2007 until his retirement on 29 February 2016.

== Awards and decorations ==
- Military Merit Medal (MMM)
- Pro Patria Medal
- Southern Africa Medal
- General Service Medal (South Africa)
- Unitas (Unity) Medal
- Medalje vir Troue Diens (Medal for Loyal Service) (30 Year Clasp)
- Good Service Medal (Silver (20 Years))
- Good Service Medal (Bronze (10 Years))

Military offices
Preceded by Leon Reeders	Director Naval Acquisition; 2007–2016	Succeeded by Anthony Morris
