= Digby Thomson =

Retired South African Navy officer

Rear Admiral Junior Grade Digby Todd St. John Thomson MMM
- Spouse: Allison Louise
- Military career
- Allegiance: South Africa
- Branch: South African Navy
- Service years: 1979-2017
- Rank: Rear Admiral (JG)
- Commands: Director Maritime Warfare; SAS Assegaai
- Conflicts: Border War
- Awards: Military Merit Medal MMM Pro Patria Medal Southern Africa Medal General Service Medal (South Africa) Unitas (Unity) Medal Medalje vir Troue Diens (Medal for Loyal Service) Good Service Medal Legion of Merit LOM

Rear Admiral (Junior Grade) Digby Thomson MMM is a retired South African Navy officer, who served as Director Maritime Warfare.

He commanded SAS Assegaai from 1999 to 2001. He was promoted to rank of naval captain in 2002 and served as Fleet Operations Manager in 2002–2003. Naval and Air Attaché to the United States of America from 2003 to 2006.

Staff officer in the Navy Office from 2006 to 2015 dealing with submarine warfare doctrine. He was promoted to rank of rear admiral junior grade in 2015. Director Maritime Warfare from 2015 until he took a severance package on 31 March 2017.

== Awards and decorations ==
- Military Merit Medal (MMM)
- Pro Patria Medal
- Southern Africa Medal
- General Service Medal (South Africa)
- Unitas (Unity) Medal
- Medalje vir Troue Diens (Medal for Loyal Service) (30 Year Clasp)
- Good Service Medal (Silver (20 Years))
- Good Service Medal (Bronze (10 Years))
- Legion of Merit (Officer) (LOM)

Military offices
| Preceded by Karl Wiesner | Director Maritime Warfare; 2015–2017 | Succeeded by Douglas Faure |
| Preceded by Derek Christian | Naval Attaché to Washington, DC; 2003–2006 | Unknown |
