= Bubele Mhlana =

South African naval officer

Rear Admiral Bubele Kitie Mhlana
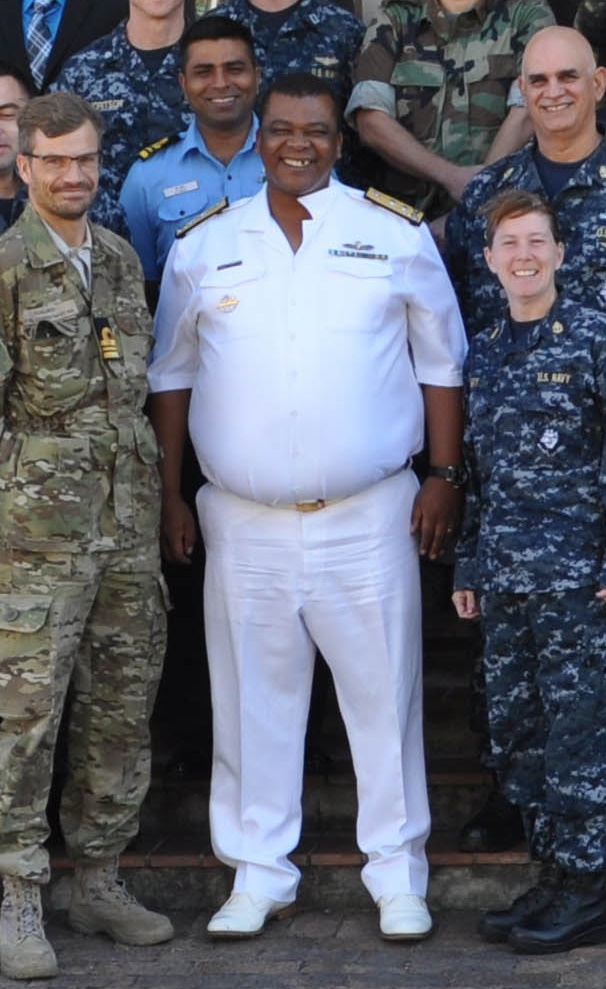
- Born: Mthatha
- Military career
- Allegiance: South Africa
- Branch: South African Navy
- Service years: 1994 –
- Rank: Rear Admiral
- Nickname: Bravo
- Commands: Deputy Chief of the Navy; Flag Officer Fleet; Director: Fleet Force Preparation; Frigate Squadron; SAS Mendi (F148); SAS Isandlwana (F146); SAS Kapa
- Awards: Tshumelo Ikatelaho (General Service Medal) Unitas (Unity) Medal Medalje vir Troue Diens (Medal for Loyal Service) Good Service Medal Tamandaré Medal of Merit

Rear Admiral Bubele Kitie Mhlana is the current serving Deputy Chief of the South African Navy, he was also the longest serving Flag Officer Fleet. He has had numerous Commands of South African warships including being the first black South African naval Officer to Command a Valour-class Frigate, the SAS ISANDLWANA F146, then later SAS MENDI F148.

He was born in the Ngangelizwe township in Mthatha.

== Military career ==
He is a former Umkhonto weSizwe (MK) operative and joined the South African Navy in 1994. He assumed command of the minesweeper SAS Kapa in 2003

In 1999 he attended the Officers Course at the South African Naval College and spent 9 months attending the International Principal Warfare Officer (A) course with the British Royal Navy.

He commanded the Valour Class Frigate SAS Isandlwana (F146) in 2007 In 2009 he attended the United States Naval War College He then commanded SAS Mendi (F148) as well as serving as Commander of the Frigate Squadron

He was appointed Flag Officer Fleet and promoted to rear admiral in 2014 In 2020 he was appointed Chief of Staff for the SANDF Joint Operations Division and Deputy Chief of the Navy from 1 February 2023. .

== Honours and awards ==
- Tshumelo Ikatelaho (General Service Medal)
- Unitas (Unity) Medal
- Medalje vir Troue Diens (Medal for Loyal Service) (20 Year Clasp)
- Good Service Medal (Bronze (10 Years))
- Tamandaré Medal of Merit (Note: Portuguese: Medalha do Mérito Tamandaré) (Brazil)

In 2012 he was awarded the Tamandaré Medal of Merit from Brazil.

== Notes ==
Military offices
Preceded by R Adm Monde Lobese	Deputy Chief of the Navy; 2023–	Incumbent
Preceded by Maj Gen Ashton Sibango	Chief of Staff Joint Operations Division; 2020–2023	Succeeded by Maj Gen Jackie Thulare
Preceded by R Adm Phillip Schoultz	Flag Officer Fleet; 2014–2020	Succeeded by R Adm Musawenkosi Nkomonde
Preceded by Karl Wiesner	Director Fleet Force Preparation; 2010–2014	Succeeded by
Preceded by	OC SAS Mendi; 2010–2010	Succeeded by
Preceded by Karl Wiesner	OC SAS Isandlwana; 2007–2010	Succeeded by
