= Teuteberg =

Teuteberg is a surname. Notable people with the surname include:

- Bernhard Teuteberg, retired South African naval officer, who served as Chief Director
- Hanno Teuteberg, retired Rear Admiral in the South African Navy, formerly serving as the Deputy Chief of the Navy
- Hans Jürgen Teuteberg (1929–2015), German historian
- Linda Teuteberg (Linda Merschin; born 1981), German lawyer and politician (FDP)
- René Teuteberg (1914–2006), Swiss historian

== See also ==
- Teutenberg
