= Guy Jamieson =

Rear Admiral David Guy Jamieson PG SM MMM
- Military career
- Allegiance: South Africa
- Branch: South African Navy
- Service years: 1978–2020
- Rank: Rear Admiral
- Service number: 76444652PE
- Commands: Deputy Chief of the Navy; Chief of Fleet Staff; SAS Amatola (F145); SAS Adam Kok; SAS Jan Smuts
- Awards: iPhrothiya yeGolide PG Southern Cross Medal SM Military Merit Medal MMM Pro Patria Medal Southern Africa Medal General Service Medal (South Africa) Unitas (Unity) Medal Medalje vir Troue Diens (Medal for Loyal Service) Good Service Medal

Rear Admiral Guy Jamieson PG SM MMM is a retired South African Navy officer, served as Deputy Chief of the South African Navy.

== Military career ==
He joined the Navy in 1978 after completing school at Hilton College. He has commanded two Warrior class strike craft, the SAS Adam Kok and the SAS Jan Smuts as well as the Strike Craft Squadron from 1997 to 1999. He was promoted Captain in 2000 and assigned to the Corvette project as a Deputy Project Officer. He became the Officer Commanding of the first Corvette SAS Amatola (F145) in 2003. In 2009 he was appointed SSO (Senior Staff Officer) Surface Warfare.

He was appointed Chief of Fleet Staff and promoted to rear admiral (junior grade) on 1 November 2011. He took over as Deputy Chief of the Navy on 1 April 2017.

== Awards and decorations ==
- iPhrothiya yeGolide (Golden Protea) (PG)
- Southern Cross Medal (1975) (SM)
- Military Merit Medal (MMM)
- Pro Patria Medal
- Southern Africa Medal
- General Service Medal (South Africa)
- Unitas (Unity) Medal
- Medalje vir Troue Diens (Medal for Loyal Service) (40 Year Clasp)
- Medalje vir Troue Diens (Medal for Loyal Service) (30 Year Clasp)
- Good Service Medal (Silver (20 Years))
- Good Service Medal (Bronze (10 Years))

Military offices
Preceded by Hanno Teuteberg	Deputy Chief of the South African Navy; 2017–2020	Succeeded by Douglas Faure
Preceded by Hanno Teuteberg	Chief of Fleet Staff; 2011–2017	Succeeded by Leslie Katernic
