= Hennie Bester =

South African admiral

Rear Admiral Hendrik van Eeden Bester SM MMM
- Military career
- Allegiance: South Africa
- Branch: South African Navy
- Service years: 1968–2008
- Rank: Rear Admiral
- Commands: Flag Officer Fleet; SAS Frans Erasmus
- Awards: Southern Cross Medal SM Military Merit Medal MMM Pro Patria Medal Southern Africa Medal General Service Medal (South Africa) Unitas (Unity) Medal Medalje vir Troue Diens (Medal for Loyal Service) Good Service Medal

Rear Admiral Hennie Bester SM MMM is a retired South African Navy officer who served as Flag Officer Fleet from 2005 to 2008, when he retired.

== Military career ==
He joined the Navy in 1968. He served on a number of ships before joining the project to acquire Strike Craft in 1976, serving as weapons and operations officer from 1978 to 1979 before being appointed Squadron planning officer in 1980. From February 1981 to December 1982 he commanded the SAS Frans Erasmus. He served as Squadron Commander from 1987 to 1988 before being promoted Captain in November 1988 and appointed Commanding officer of the Strike Craft Flotilla.

He was appointed Director Naval Planning in 1994 and in 1998 he joined the Joint Operations Division as Director Force Employment and promoted to rear admiral (junior grade). He was appointed Director Maritime Warfare at Navy Office in February 2002 and promoted to rear admiral on 1 February 2005 and appointed Flag Officer Fleet.

== Awards and decorations ==
- Southern Cross Medal (1975) (SM)
- Military Merit Medal (MMM)
- Pro Patria Medal
- Southern Africa Medal
- General Service Medal (South Africa)
- Unitas (Unity) Medal
- Medalje vir Troue Diens (Medal for Loyal Service) (40 Year Clasp)
- Good Service Medal (Gold (30 Years))
- Good Service Medal (Silver (20 Years))
- Good Service Medal (Bronze (10 Years))

Military offices
Preceded by Eric Green	Flag Officer Fleet; 2005-2008	Succeeded by Robert W. Higgs
Preceded by Steven Stead	Director Maritime Warfare, Navy Office; 2002-2005	Succeeded by Bryan R. Donkin
Unknown	Director Force Preparation, Joint Operations; 1998-2002	Unknown
