= Bernhard Teuteberg =

Rear Admiral Bernhard Teuteberg SD, SM, MMM, SAN (Rtd)
- Spouse: Salomé
- Relatives: Rear Admiral Hanno Teuteberg SM MMM SAN (Rtd)
- Military career
- Allegiance: South Africa
- Branch: South African Navy
- Service years: 1971–2012
- Rank: Rear Admiral
- Nickname: Bernie
- Unit: SAS Protea (A324)
- Commands: OC South African Naval College; OC SAS Protea (A324)
- Conflicts: Border War
- Awards: Southern Cross Decoration SD Southern Cross Medal SM Military Merit Medal MMM General Service Medal (South Africa) Unitas (Unity) Medal Medalje vir Troue Diens (Medal for Loyal Service) Good Service Medal Order of Naval Merit

Rear Admiral Bernhard Hein Teuteberg SD SM MMM SAN (Rtd) is a retired South African naval officer, who served as Chief Director: Maritime Strategy before his retirement.

== Military career ==
He commanded the South African Naval College and SAS Protea (A324).

He served as Director Maritime Plans, SA Navy Hydrographer and Director Fleet Human Resources from 1999 to 2001, after which he was appointed Director Naval Personnel at the Navy Office.

== Awards and decorations ==
- Southern Cross Decoration (SD)
- Southern Cross Medal (1975) (SM)
- Military Merit Medal (MMM)
- General Service Medal (South Africa)
- Unitas (Unity) Medal
- Medalje vir Troue Diens (Medal for Loyal Service) (40 Year Clasp)
- Good Service Medal (Gold (30 Years))
- Good Service Medal (Silver (20 Years))
- Good Service Medal (Bronze (10 Years))
- Order of Naval Merit (Grand Officer) (Note: Portuguese: Ordem do Mérito Naval - Grande-Oficial) (Brazil)

== Notes ==
Military offices
Preceded by Rolf Hauter	Chief Director Maritime Strategy; 2009–2014	Succeeded by Hanno Teuteberg
Preceded by Steve du Toit as CNS Personnel	Director Naval Personnel; 1999–20??	Unknown
