= Anthony Howell (admiral) =

South African admiral

Rear Admiral Anthony Neville Howell SD SM MMM SAN (Rtd)
- Born: 18 February 1947 (age 79)
- Military career
- Allegiance: South Africa
- Branch: South African Navy
- Service years: 1965–2001
- Rank: Rear Admiral
- Unit: SAS Maria van Riebeeck
- Commands: Chief Director Maritime Warfare; Director Naval Acquisitions; OC South African Naval College
- Conflicts: Border War
- Awards: Southern Cross Decoration SD Southern Cross Medal SM Military Merit Medal MMM Pro Patria Medal Southern Africa Medal General Service Medal (South Africa) Unitas (Unity) Medal Good Service Medal

Anthony Neville Howell SD SM MMM SAN (Rtd) (born 18 February 1947) is a retired Rear Admiral of the South African Navy. After completing school at Fish Hoek High School in 1964, he joined the Navy in 1965. He trained at the Naval Gymnasium in Saldanha and Naval College. He completed a B. Mil degree at the South African Military Academy in 1968 and then volunteered for submarines. He was Communications Officer on the SAS Maria van Riebeeck, and served in SAS Emily Hobhouse as Detection and Weapons Officer, First Lieutenant. He commanded the submarine SAS Maria van Riebeeck from 1970 to 1980. From 1981 to 1983. Director Naval Personnel Plans at Naval HQ during 1986–1989. He was the Officer Commanding South African Naval College from 1989 to 1992. In 1993 he was promoted to Commodore (later changed to Rear Admiral (Junior Grade)) and appointed Chief of Naval Staff Plans. In 1998 he was appointed Director Naval Acquisition before being promoted to rear admiral on 1 April 1999 with appointment as Chief Director Maritime Warfare. He retired from the Navy on 31 July 2001

== Awards ==
- Southern Cross Decoration (SD) (South Africa)
- Southern Cross Medal (1975) (SM) (South Africa)
- Military Merit Medal (MMM) (South Africa)
- Pro Patria Medal (South Africa)
- Southern Africa Medal (South Africa)
- General Service Medal (South Africa) (South Africa)
- Unitas (Unity) Medal (South Africa)
- Good Service Medal (Gold (30 Years)) (South Africa)
- Good Service Medal (Silver (20 Years)) (South Africa)
- Good Service Medal (Bronze (10 Years)) (South Africa)

Military offices
New title Established	Chief Director Maritime Warfare; 1999–2001	Succeeded by Disbanded
Preceded by New	Director Naval Acquisition; 1998–1999	Succeeded by Ockert van der Schyf
Unknown	Chief of Naval Staff Plans; 1993–1998	Succeeded by Eric Green
Preceded by Jacques de Vos	OC South African Naval College; 1989–1992	Succeeded by Rolf Hauter
