= Hanno Teuteberg =

Rear Admiral from the South African Navy

Rear Admiral William Hans Otto Teuteberg SM MMM SAN (Rtd)
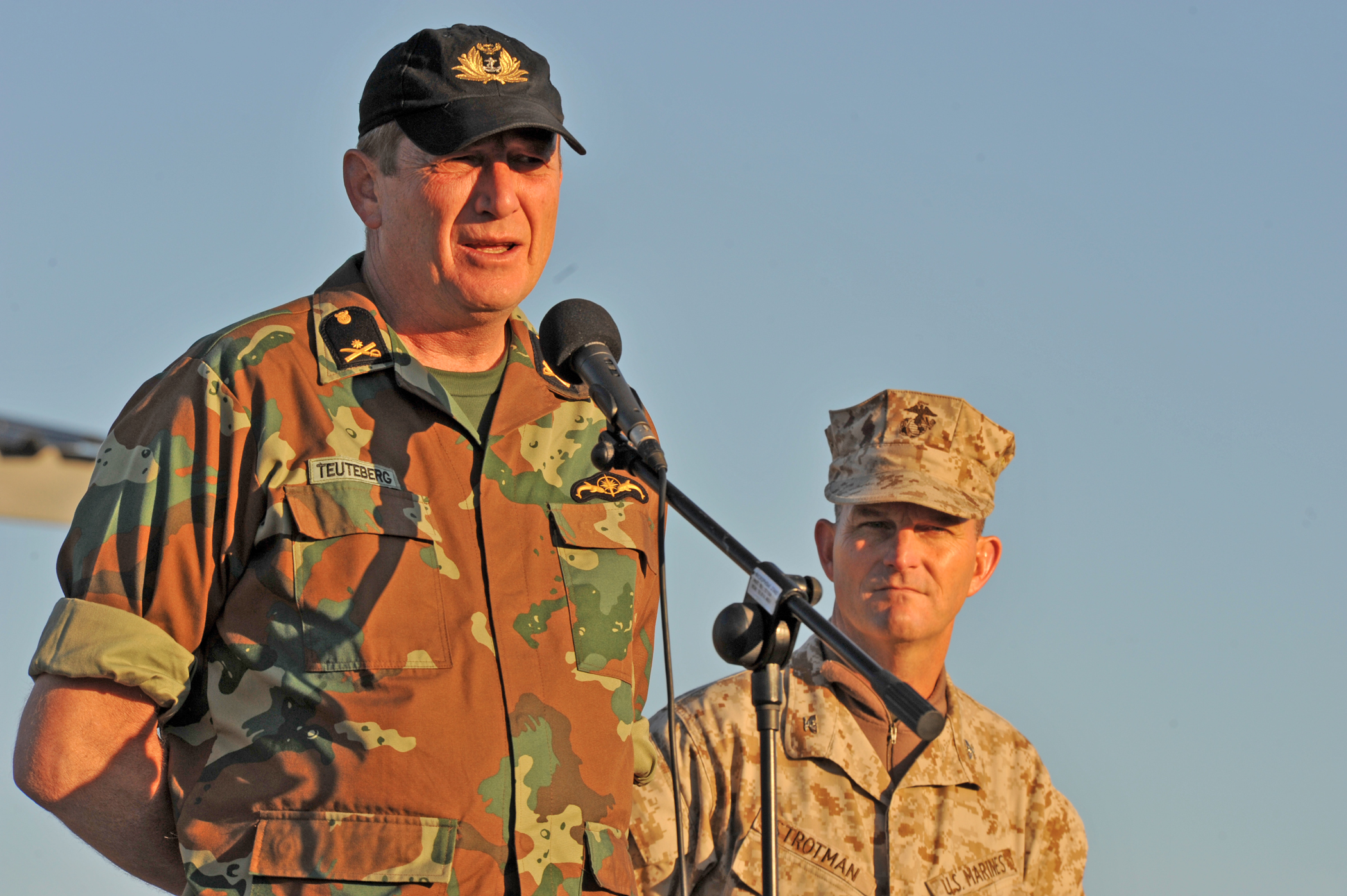
- Relatives: Bernhard Teuteberg SD SM MMM SAN (Rtd) (older brother)
- Military career
- Allegiance: South Africa
- Branch: South African Navy
- Service years: 1977–2017
- Rank: Rear Admiral
- Nickname: Hanno
- Service number: 75324129 PE
- Commands: Deputy Chief of the Navy
- Awards: Southern Cross Medal SM Military Merit Medal MMM Pro Patria Medal Southern Africa Medal General Service Medal (South Africa) Unitas (Unity) Medal Medalje vir Troue Diens (Medal for Loyal Service) Good Service Medal Order of Naval Merit

Hanno Teuteberg SM MMM SAN (Rtd) is a retired Rear Admiral from the South African Navy, formerly serving as the Deputy Chief of the Navy.

He joined the South African Navy in 1977 and qualified aboard submarines.

He was defence attaché in Germany from 2003 to 2006 during the delivery of four Valour-class frigates as part of the Arms Deal.

From July 2006 until Dec 2008, he served as Director Fleet Force Preparation, followed by a stint as the Director Maritime Warfare from June 2009 until December 2010 in Pretoria.

From 1 January 2011 until November 2011 he was the Chief of Fleet Staff at Fleet Command in Simon's Town followed by the post of Director Joint Force Preparations and Training with Chief of Joint Operations.

He was promoted to Chief Director Maritime Strategy from 1 February 2013, taking over from his brother Bernhard and promoted to rear admiral.

There was some controversy in the press when he was passed over for appointment to head the Navy, apparently due to his being white. In 2016 it was announced that he was taking voluntary early retirement and was leaving the Navy on 31 March 2016.

== Sailing ==
He is a keen sailor and took Line honours in the 1993 Cape to Rio yacht race. In 1995 he received South African Sailing colours for his part of the South African Admiral's Cup Team.

== Honours and awards ==
- Southern Cross Medal (1975) (SM)
- Military Merit Medal (MMM)
- Pro Patria Medal
- Southern Africa Medal
- General Service Medal (South Africa)
- Unitas (Unity) Medal
- Medalje vir Troue Diens (Medal for Loyal Service) (40 Year Clasp)
- Medalje vir Troue Diens (Medal for Loyal Service) (30 Year Clasp)
- Good Service Medal (Silver (20 Years))
- Good Service Medal (Bronze (10 Years))
- Grand Officer Order of Naval Merit (Brazil)

In June 2013 he was awarded the Naval Order of Merit Medal from the Brazilian Navy and in 2015 he was awarded the Argentine Naval Cross for Distinguished Services by the Argentine Navy.

Military offices
Preceded by Samuel Hlongwane	Deputy Chief of the South African Navy; 2014–2017	Succeeded by Guy Jamieson
Preceded by Bernhard Teuteberg	Chief Director: Maritime Strategy; 2013–2014	Succeeded by Sagaren Pillay
Unknown	Director Joint Force Preparation & Training; 2011–2013	Unknown
Preceded by Samuel Hlongwane	Chief of Fleet Staff; 1 Jan 2011–30 Oct 2011	Succeeded by Guy Jamieson
Preceded by Gert Basson	Director Maritime Warfare; 1 Aug 2009–30 Sept 2010	Succeeded by Karl Wiesner
Preceded by Jan Rabe	Director Fleet Force Preparation; 2006–2009	Unknown
