= Douglas Faure =

South African naval officer

Rear Admiral Douglas Roy Faure
- Military career
- Allegiance: South Africa
- Branch: South African Navy
- Rank: Rear Admiral
- Service number: 77451359PE
- Commands: Deputy Chief of the Navy; Director Maritime Warfare; SAS Simonsberg; SAS Spioenkop
- Awards: Pro Patria Medal Southern Africa Medal General Service Medal (South Africa) Unitas (Unity) Medal Medalje vir Troue Diens (Medal for Loyal Service) Good Service Medal

Rear Admiral Douglas Faure is a former South African naval officer.

== Military career ==
He served as the first commanding officer of SAS Spioenkop. until 2008 when he was appointed Senior Staff Officer Combat Support. He was appointed Officer Commanding of SAS Simonsberg on 1 October 2008.

He served as Director Maritime Warfare from 1 April 2017 till 1 June 2020, when he was promoted to Deputy Chief of the Navy.

== Awards and decorations ==
- Pro Patria Medal
- Southern Africa Medal
- General Service Medal (South Africa)
- Unitas (Unity) Medal
- Medalje vir Troue Diens (Medal for Loyal Service) (30 Year Clasp)
- Good Service Medal (Silver (20 Years))
- Good Service Medal (Bronze (10 Years))

Military offices
Preceded by Guy Jamieson	Deputy Chief of the South African Navy; 2020–2021	Succeeded by Monde Lobese
Preceded by Digby Thomson	Director Maritime Warfare; 2017–2020	Succeeded by Thamsanqa Matsane
