= Admiral Green =

Admiral Green may refer to:

- Alan Green (admiral) (born 1952), South African Navy rear admiral
- Collin P. Green (born 1962), U.S. Navy vice admiral
- Eric Green (admiral) (died 2014), South African Navy rear admiral
- John Green (Royal Navy officer) (1866–1948), British Royal Navy admiral

== See also ==
- Philip H. Greene Jr. (fl. 1970s–2010s), U.S. Navy rear admiral
- Theodore P. Greene (1809–1887), U.S. Navy rear admiral
