= Karl Wiesner =

R Adm (JG) Karl Wiesner PS MMM
- Born: Mbuzini, Transvaal
- Military career
- Allegiance: South Africa
- Branch: South African Navy
- Rank: Rear Admiral (JG)
- Commands: Director Maritime Warfare; SAS Isandlwana (F146); SAS Job Masego; SAS Kobe Coetsee

Rear Admiral (Junior Grade) Karl Wiesner PS MMM is a retired South African Navy officer, who served as Director Maritime Warfare.

He attended the United States Naval War College in Newport, Rhode Island where he earned a diploma in National Security and Strategy and was awarded the Vice Admiral Doyle prize for International Law and Peacekeeping.

He commanded SAS Isandlwana (F146) from 2002 to 2007.

He also commanded the Warrior class strike craft SAS Job Masego and SAS Kobe Coetsee.

He is currently the chief commercial operations officer of South African Shipyards.

== Awards and decorations ==
- iPhrothiya yeSiliva (Silver Protea) (PS)
- Military Merit Medal (MMM)
- Pro Patria Medal
- Southern Africa Medal
- General Service Medal (South Africa)
- Unitas (Unity) Medal
- Medalje vir Troue Diens (Medal for Loyal Service) (20 Year Clasp)
- Good Service Medal (Bronze (10 Years))

Military offices
Preceded by Bubele Mhlana	Director Fleet Force Preparation; 2013–2014	Succeeded by Solomon Pieteson
Preceded by Hanno Teuteberg	Director Maritime Warfare; 2011–2012	Succeeded by Digby Thomson
Unknown	OC SAS Isandlwana; 2002 – 2007	Unknown
