= Eric Green (admiral) =

Rear Admiral Eric Melville Green SD SM MMM
- Born: 5 January 1945; Strand, Cape Town
- Died: 25 January 2014 (aged 69)
- Spouse: Nikki Green ()
- Relatives: Rear Admiral Alan Green MMM (brother)
- Military career
- Allegiance: South Africa
- Branch: South African Navy
- Service years: 1963–2005
- Rank: Rear Admiral
- Unit: SAS Tafelberg
- Commands: Flag Officer Fleet; SAS Tafelberg
- Conflicts: South African Border War
- Awards: Southern Cross Decoration SD Southern Cross Medal SM Military Merit Medal MMM Pro Patria Medal Southern Africa Medal General Service Medal (South Africa) Unitas (Unity) Medal Medalje vir Troue Diens (Medal for Loyal Service) Good Service Medal

Rear Admiral Eric Green SD SM MMM (5 January 1945 – 25 January 2014 (aged 69)) was a South African Navy officer who served as Flag Officer Fleet from 1999 to 2005, when he retired.

== Early life ==
He attended Hendrik Louw Primary School and matriculated from Hottentots Holland High School, Somerset West in 1962 where he was a boxer.

== Military career ==
He started at the Naval Gymnasium at Saldanha Bay in 1963, then attended the Military Academy, and later graduated from Stellenbosch University in 1966. He served as a Watch keeping Officer on several vessels, including the SAS President Pretorius, SAS President Steyn, SAS President Kruger, SAS Kimberley, and SAS Port Elizabeth. He completed the Communications - Electronics Warfare course at HMS Mercury and became the OC of SAS Johannesburg. In 1982, he finished the SAAF Senior Command Staff Course. He also commanded the supply ship SAS Tafelberg from 1987 to 1990. According to a report in Die Burger dated August 12, 1988, the vessel had completed 21 years of service.

He commanded the SAS Simonsberg from 1990–1992 and completed Joint Staff Course no. 24 in 1990. He was the OC of the Defence College from 1993–1996, and he was promoted to Commodore. He served as the Chief of Naval Staff Plans from 1998–1999. He was the Inaugural Flag Officer Fleet from March 1, 1999, until he retired with a pension on January 31, 2005.

His decorations include the Southern Cross Decoration and the Medal for Distinguished Conduct and Loyal Service for 40 years service.

He died in 2014.

== Awards and decorations ==
- Southern Cross Decoration (SD)
- Southern Cross Medal (1975) (SM)
- Military Merit Medal (MMM)
- Pro Patria Medal
- Southern Africa Medal
- General Service Medal (South Africa)
- Unitas (Unity) Medal
- Medalje vir Troue Diens (Medal for Loyal Service) (40 Year Clasp)
- Good Service Medal (Gold (30 Years))
- Good Service Medal (Silver (20 Years))
- Good Service Medal (Bronze (10 Years))

Military offices
Preceded by New Post	Flag Officer Fleet; 1999–2005	Succeeded by Hennie Bester
Preceded by Anthony Howell	Chief of Naval Staff Plans; 1998–1999	Succeeded by Disbanded
Preceded by M.J. du Plessis (SAAF)	Commandant SA Defence College; 1993–1996	Succeeded by As Kleynhans
