= Alan Green (admiral) =

Rear Admiral Alan Graham Green MMM
- Born: 19 December 1952 (age 73); Strand, Cape Town
- Relatives: Rear Admiral Eric Green SD SM MMM (brother)
- Military career
- Allegiance: South Africa
- Branch: South African Navy
- Service years: 1971–2012
- Rank: Rear Admiral
- Unit: SAS Kobie Coetzee
- Commands: OC SAS Kobie Coetzee; OC SAS Simonsberg; CoS SANDF Training Command
- Conflicts: South African Border War
- Awards: Military Merit Medal MMM Pro Patria Medal Southern Africa Medal General Service Medal (South Africa) Unitas (Unity) Medal Medalje vir Troue Diens (Medal for Loyal Service) Good Service Medal

Rear Admiral Alan Green MMM (born 19 December 1952) is a retired South African Navy officer who served as Chief: Military Policy, Strategy and Planning for the South African National Defence Force from 1 Nov 2011. He retired in Dec 2012.

== Military career ==
He was born in Cape Town and matriculated from Hottentots Holland High School, Somerset West in 1970. He joined the navy in 1971. Alan attended the South African Military Academy and graduated with a Bachelor's degree in Military Science from Stellenbosch University.

He later commanded the Warrior class strike craft SAS Job Masego (previously SAS Kobie Coetzee) in 1988–1999. Defence Advisor to France during 1996–1998. He completed the Joint Staff Course Nr. 42 in 1999.

Cdr Green completed the South African Navy Senior Staff Course before the joint concept system was widely implemented in 2002. Like his older brother he was a boxer and also commanded the SAS Simonsberg much later.

Commander SAS Simonsberg from 1999–2002, Chief of Staff SANDF Training Command from 2002–2007 as a rear admiral (junior grade). Director Military Strategy at Military Policy Strategy Planning Division from July 2007–December 2010. He was promoted to two star admiral in January 2011 and appointed as the Chief of Military Policy Strategy Planning at the Corporate Staff Division.

His awards and honours include the Medal for Distinguished Conduct and Loyal Service for 40 years service.

He retired from the SANDF on 31 December 2012.

== Awards and decorations ==
- Military Merit Medal (MMM)
- Pro Patria Medal
- Southern Africa Medal
- General Service Medal (South Africa)
- Unitas (Unity) Medal
- Medalje vir Troue Diens (Medal for Loyal Service) (40 Year Clasp)
- Good Service Medal (Gold (30 Years))
- Good Service Medal (Silver (20 Years))
- Good Service Medal (Bronze (10 Years))

Military offices
Unknown	Chief of Military Policy, Strategy & Planning; 2011–2012	Succeeded by Michael Ramantswana
Preceded by Brig Gen Les Rudman	Director Military Strategy & Planning; 2006–2010	Succeeded by R Adm Dirk de Villiers
Preceded by Brig Gen WH Bowie	Chief of Staff, Joint Training Formation; 2002–2006	Succeeded by Brig Gen TR Mandela
