= Distinguished Service Order (disambiguation) =

The Distinguished Service Order is a military decoration of the United Kingdom.

Distinguished Service Order may also refer to:

- Distinguished Service Order (Argentina)
- Distinguished Service Order (Vietnam)
- Distinguished Service Order (Singapore), Darjah Utama Bakti Cemerlang, Singapore
- Distinguished Service Order (Military), Darjah Utama Bakti Cemerlang (Tentera), Singapore

== See also ==
- DSO (disambiguation)
