= Music of Iowa =

Collection of notable musicians

The music of Iowa includes such notable musicians as Rock and Roll Hall of Famers The Everly Brothers (who had 3 #1 Top 100 hits, including "All I Have to Do Is Dream" in 1958), Bix Beiderbecke, Art Farmer, Peggy Gilbert, Patty Waters, Mortimer Wilson, Thurlow Lieurance, Charlie Haden, Arthur Russell, Greg Brown, William Elliott Whitmore, Clarence Whitehill, Andy Williams, Meredith Willson, composer of The Music Man, and Alice Ettinger who was renowned enough to perform in Europe in the 1890s. Famed swing era musician and band leader Glenn Miller was born in Clarinda. Rock and metal bands from Iowa include B. R. Olson, a phenomenal guitarist in Des Moines, For Today, Euforquestra, The Envy Corps, In Loving Memory, The Cassandra Disease, Hawks, Slipknot (who had 3 #1 Billboard 200 albums like All Hope is Gone in 2008), Stone Sour, Radio Moscow, LOVE UNLiMiTED,Modern Life Is War, West Avenue (band), Marmot, and Unknown Component. The city of Walnut is home to the National Traditional Country Music Association (NTCMA), which produces programs for local radio and television in Iowa. NTCMA also operates the Walnut Country Opera House, which is a theatre and home to several halls of fame and museums. The town of Clear Lake is known as the place the Big Bopper, Buddy Holly and Ritchie Valens took off from on the day they died; their last performance was at the Surf Ballroom. The Escorts (Do's & Don'ts) are one of the first bands to be inducted into the Iowa Rock N Roll Music Association's Hall of Fame. Sioux City brought to the National scene The Velaires, and rocker Tommy Bolin. Also from Iowa is Black Iowegian heavy blues artist John-Paul Jones Group.

== Festivals ==
Clear Lake is also home to the annual Buddy Holly Tribute festival. There is a National Old-Time Country Music Contest and Festival in Avoca, which draws upwards of 50,000 people according to The Country Music Lover's Guide to the U.S.A. Iowa is also home to the Iowa Women's Music Festival and the Central Iowa Traditional Dance and Music Festival in Ames. In July 2008, the inaugural 80/35 Music Festival was held in Des Moines, drawing an estimated 30,000 music fans over 2 days. Iowa City's Mission Creek Festival showcases music and literature and is held every spring. In September 2011 Maximum Ames Music Festival had its first year in Ames, Iowa. It has become an annual event drawing national headliners as well as over 100 regional bands each year.

Garner, Iowa has been home to the Bash on the Farm Christian Music festival since 2002. The free concert features regional acts as well as national acts such as Stellar Kart, The Wedding, Keith Tkachuk and the Flying Mongooses, and 3sp.

== Music institutions and venues ==
Music institutions and venues Iowa is also home to the Des Moines Symphony Orchestra, Des Moines Metro Opera, Quad City Symphony Orchestra, Dubuque Symphony Orchestra, Cedar Rapids Opera, Orchestra Iowa (Cedar Rapids), Sioux City Symphony Orchestra, Waterloo/Cedar Falls Symphony Orchestra, Southeast Iowa Symphony Orchestra, and the Northwest Iowa Symphony Orchestra.

The three major university music institutions in Iowa include the Iowa State University School of Music in Ames, University of Iowa School of Music in Iowa City, and The University of Northern Iowa School of Music in Cedar Falls, Iowa. Other colleges with music programs include Wartburg, Luther, Cornell, Morningside, and Drake, among others. Also, there is the Celtic Music Association of Des Moines. Major venues include the Civic Center of Greater Des Moines.

The Nordic Choir at Luther College in Decorah has performed around the world, appearing in Norway, England, Germany, Russia, Poland, Hungary, Romania, the Baltic countries, Mexico and the Caribbean. The Nordic Choir has also appeared throughout the United States, performing in well-known concert halls as Lincoln Center in New York and the John F. Kennedy Center for the Performing Arts in Washington, D.C. Additionally, Luther College has the largest collegiate choral program in the United States with almost 600 student singers.

== Indigenous music ==
The first music of Iowa was that of Indigenous peoples living in the state prior to colonial interaction. The first settlers in Iowa were mostly of Siouan background. The Meskwaki and Sauk were moved into the Tama Settlement from their ancestral lands between Wisconsin and Illinois; there is also the Sac and Fox Nation in Oklahoma and the Sac and Fox tribes in Kansas and Nebraska.

== Ethnic musicians and groups ==
Foot-Notes of Decorah began playing Scandinavian-American old time dance music in 1991 under the leadership of fiddler Beth Hoven Rotto. Foot-Notes maintains an oral tradition of tunes passed down by old time fiddlers in the "borderlands" around Decorah, Iowa and Spring Grove, Minnesota, most prominent of these fiddlers being Bill Sherburne, a notable Norwegian-American fiddler who died at age 90 in 1991. Rotto apprenticed with Sherburne and learned his complete repertoire his passing. The band continues a tradition of playing for community dances in a rustic 1911 vintage two-room schoolhouse in Highlandville, Iowa, where such dances began in the mid-1970s with the music of Bill Sherburne and his band. Foot-Notes music has been featured on Minnesota, Wisconsin, and Iowa public radio and Norwegian national radio programs. The group was selected to represent the State of Iowa at the Smithsonian Institution Festival of American Folklife in 1996 and the Festival of Iowa Folklife in Des Moines, Iowa that same year. [www.footnotesdance.com]
