= Three College Observatory =

Observatory in North Carolina, US

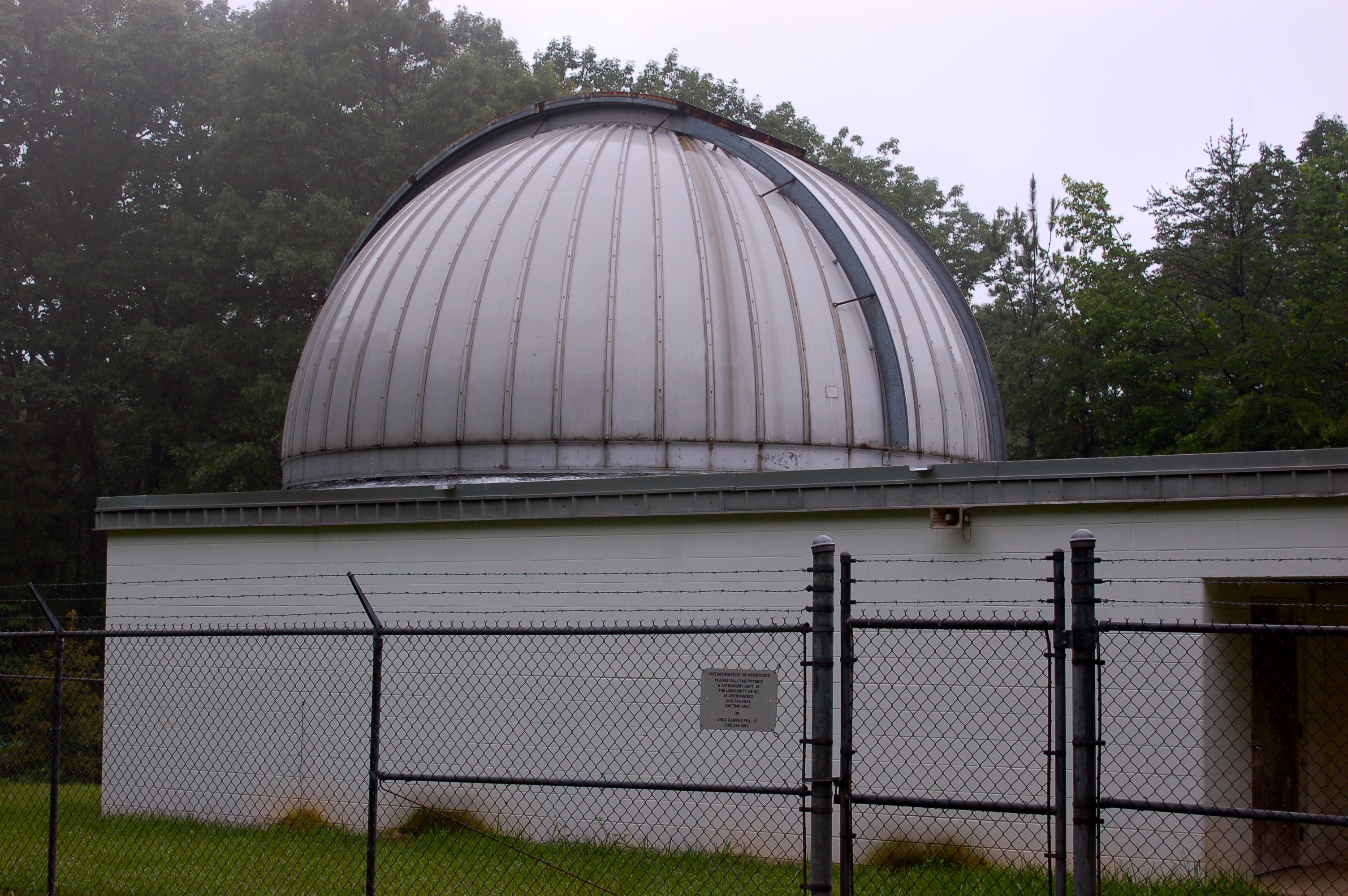
- Three College Observatory near Snow Camp, NC
- Organization: UNCG, N.C. A&T, GC
- Location: near Graham, North Carolina
- Coordinates: 35.9449°N 79.4068°W
- Altitude: 183 meters (600 ft)
- Established: 1979
- Website: Three College Observatory

Telescopes
- Three College Observatory Telescope: 0.81 m reflector

Three College Observatory (TCO) is an astronomical observatory owned and operated by The University of North Carolina at Greensboro (UNCG), North Carolina Agricultural and Technical State University (N.C. A&T), and Guilford College (GC). Built in 1979, it is located 10 kilometers (6 mi) south of Graham, North Carolina (USA), in the Cane Creek Mountains. The observatory, designed by W. Edward Jenkins, was funded with a $250,000 grant, however, it would cost $1.5 million to replace it today. The observatory's primary instrument is a 32 in (81 cm) Ritchey-Chrétien reflecting telescope attached to an equatorial mount. It was built by Sigma Research and installed at TCO in 1981. TCO is used by UNCG for instruction and outreach. It continues to be the largest telescope in North Carolina and ones of the largest telescopes in the southeast.

== See also ==
- Dark Sky Observatory
- List of astronomical observatories
