= Teutenberg =

Teutenberg is a surname. Notable people with the surname include:

- Anton Teutenberg (1840–1933), New Zealand stonemason, carver, engraver, medallist and jeweller
- Ina-Yoko Teutenberg (born 1974), German former road bicycle racer
- Lars Teutenberg (born 1970), German professional bicycle rider
- Lea Lin Teutenberg (born 1999), German professional racing cyclist
- Sven Teutenberg (born 1972), German cyclist
- Tim Torn Teutenberg (born 2002), German cyclist

== See also ==
- Teuteberg
