= Fleet Command (SA Navy) =

- Active: 1999 to date
- Country: South Africa
- Branch: South African Navy
- Garrison/HQ: Naval Base Simon's Town

Commanders
- Flag Officer Fleet: RADM Musawenkosi Nkomonde
- Fleet Master at Arms: CWO Vika

Fleet Command is the South African Navy's single type command and controls all vessels and units of the South African Navy, besides Naval Headquarters. The commander of Fleet Command is a Rear Admiral and referred to as Flag Officer Fleet (FOF). The post was previously known as Chief of Naval Operations.

Fleet Command was formed on 1 April 1999 following a Defense review, with Rear Admiral Eric Green as the first Flag Officer Fleet.

== Command, control and organisation ==
Four directorates are responsible for the day to day control of Fleet Command:

- Director Fleet Force Preparations (DFFP)
- Director Fleet Human Resources (DFHR)
- Director Fleet Quality Assurance (DFQA)
- Director Fleet Logistics (DFL)

=== Past Flag Officers Fleet ===
- 1999 to 2005 - Rear Admiral Eric Green
- 2005 to 2008 - Rear Admiral Hennie Bester
- 2008 to December 2010 - Rear Admiral Robert Higgs
- December 2010 to 1 February 2014 - Rear Admiral Phillip Schoultz
- 1 February 2014 to 31 March 2020 - Rear Admiral Bubele Mhlana
- 1 April 2020 to current - Rear Admiral Musawenkosi Nkomonde

== Force preparation ==
Director Fleet Force Preparations is responsible for the day-to-day running of the ships and submarines and for ensuring their operational readiness. The Maritime Reaction Squadron and Navcomcens also report into DFFP.

=== Maritime Reaction Squadron ===
The Naval Rapid Deployment Force (NRDF), now known as the Maritime Reaction Squadron (MRS), was formed in 2006.

The main aim of this specialised unit is to deploy infantry-trained South African Navy members in various peacekeeping roles within the African continent and to assist in boarding operations at sea, humanitarian operations and disaster relief.

The squadron consists of the following components:

- Operational Boat Division (OBD), with 10 Namacurra-class harbour patrol boats and six Lima-class utility landing craft
- Reaction Force Division (RFD), consisting of one naval infantry company with a command and support element
- Operational Diving Division (ODD), consisting of four operational diving teams (ODT) of 17 divers

== Human resources ==
Director Fleet Human Resources is responsible for all training and manning and also controls the training units.

=== Training units ===
- SAS Saldanha - located on the West Coast and provides training and development for ratings
- SAS Wingfield - located in the Greater Cape Town area; provides practical training for apprentices and the technical musterings
- SAS Simonsberg - training in gunnery, anti-submarine warfare, communications, diving and seamanship
- South African Naval College Gordon's Bay - training college for naval officers
- Maritime Warfare School, Simonstown
- NBCD School - nuclear, biological, and damage control training

== Logistics ==
Director Fleet Logistics is responsible for all Logistics units as well as for the maintenance of the fleet.

=== Logistics units ===
- Naval Armament Depot
- Naval Dockyard
- Naval Stores Depot
- Fleet Maintenance Unit
- Naval Publications Unit

== Quality assurance ==
Director Fleet Quality Assurance is responsible for the output of Fleet Command and monitoring Quality Assurance throughout Fleet Command.
