= Closure Commemoration Medal =

South African military commemoration medal

- Type: Military commemorative medal
- Awarded for: Commemoration of the disbandment of the Commandos
- Country: South Africa
- Presented by: the President
- Eligibility: Commando members
- Clasps: COMMANDOS
- Status: Current
- Established: 2010
- First award: 2011
- Ribbon bar

Order of wear
- Next (higher): Unitas Medal
- Next (lower): Medalje vir Troue Diens and Bar, 50 years

The Closure Commemoration Medal is a military commemoration medal which was instituted by the President of the Republic of South Africa in 2010, to commemorate the disbandment of the Commandos, the rural defence component of the South African National Defence Force.

== The South African military ==
The Union Defence Forces (UDF) were established in 1912 and renamed the South African Defence Force (SADF) in 1958. It consisted of three components, the full-time Permanent Force, the part-time Citizen Force and the rural defence Commandos. On 27 April 1994, the SADF was integrated with six other independent forces into the South African National Defence Force (SANDF).

== Institution ==
The 183 South African Commando units, consisting of 52,000 serving members, were disbanded in 2003 and members were given the opportunity to join the conventional Citizen Force Regiments or the Sector Policing Forums of the South African Police Service, or to demobilise. The Closure Commemoration Medal was instituted by the President in 2010 to commemorate the disbandment of the Commandos.

== Award criteria ==
The medal could be awarded to Officers, Warrant Officers, Non-Commissioned Officers and Other Ranks who have served in the Commandos, as well as to the Honorary Colonels, who had completed at least five years service on or after 27 April 2003. The first medals were presented to former Commando members on 30 November 2011.

== Order of wear ==
The Closure Commemoration Medal was instituted subsequent to the publication of the most recent revision of the "South African Consolidated Official Table of Precedence : Orders, Decorations and Medals" on 11 March 2005. As a newly instituted commemoration medal, its logical position in the order of precedence is between the lowest ranked commemoration award and the highest ranked award for loyal service and good conduct.

- Official military order of precedence:
  - Preceded by the Unitas Medal of the Republic of South Africa.
  - Succeeded by the Medalje vir Troue Diens and Bar, 50 years of the Republic of South Africa.
- Official national order of precedence:
  - Preceded by the Police Service Amalgamation Medal of the Republic of South Africa.
  - Succeeded by the Medalje vir Troue Diens and Bar, 50 years of the Republic of South Africa.

== Description ==
Obverse

The Closure Commemoration Medal is a medallion struck in nickel-silver, 38 millimetres in diameter and 3 millimetres thick at the rim, displaying three stacked .303 Lee–Enfield rifles within a wreath of proteas.

Reverse

The reverse displays the embellished Coat of arms of South Africa above a bar bearing the stamped medal number and, around the perimeter, the inscriptions "CLOSURE COMMEMORATION MEDAL" at left, "SLUITINGSGEDENKMEDALJE" at right and "MEDALE WA KGOTSO WA MATSWALELAKGORO" below.

Clasp

A clasp inscribed "COMMANDOS" was instituted along with the medal, to be worn on the medal ribbon. It was struck in nickel-silver and has a hole at each end to allow it to be sewn onto the medal ribbon.

Ribbon

The ribbon is 32 millimetres wide and green, with a 12 millimetres wide yellow band in the centre. The green and yellow colours have their origin in the ribbon colours of the three awards which were belatedly instituted in 1920, as retrospective awards for Boer veteran officers and men of the Second Boer War of 1899–1902, the Dekoratie voor Trouwe Dienst, the Medalje voor de Anglo-Boere Oorlog and the Lint voor Verwonding. For these three awards, these two colours had been gazetted as green and orange, but the orange appeared as yellow on the actual ribbons.

== Discontinuation ==
Conferment of the Closure Commemoration Medal has not yet been discontinued and qualifying ex-members may still apply.
