= Musawenkosi Nkomonde =

South African naval officer

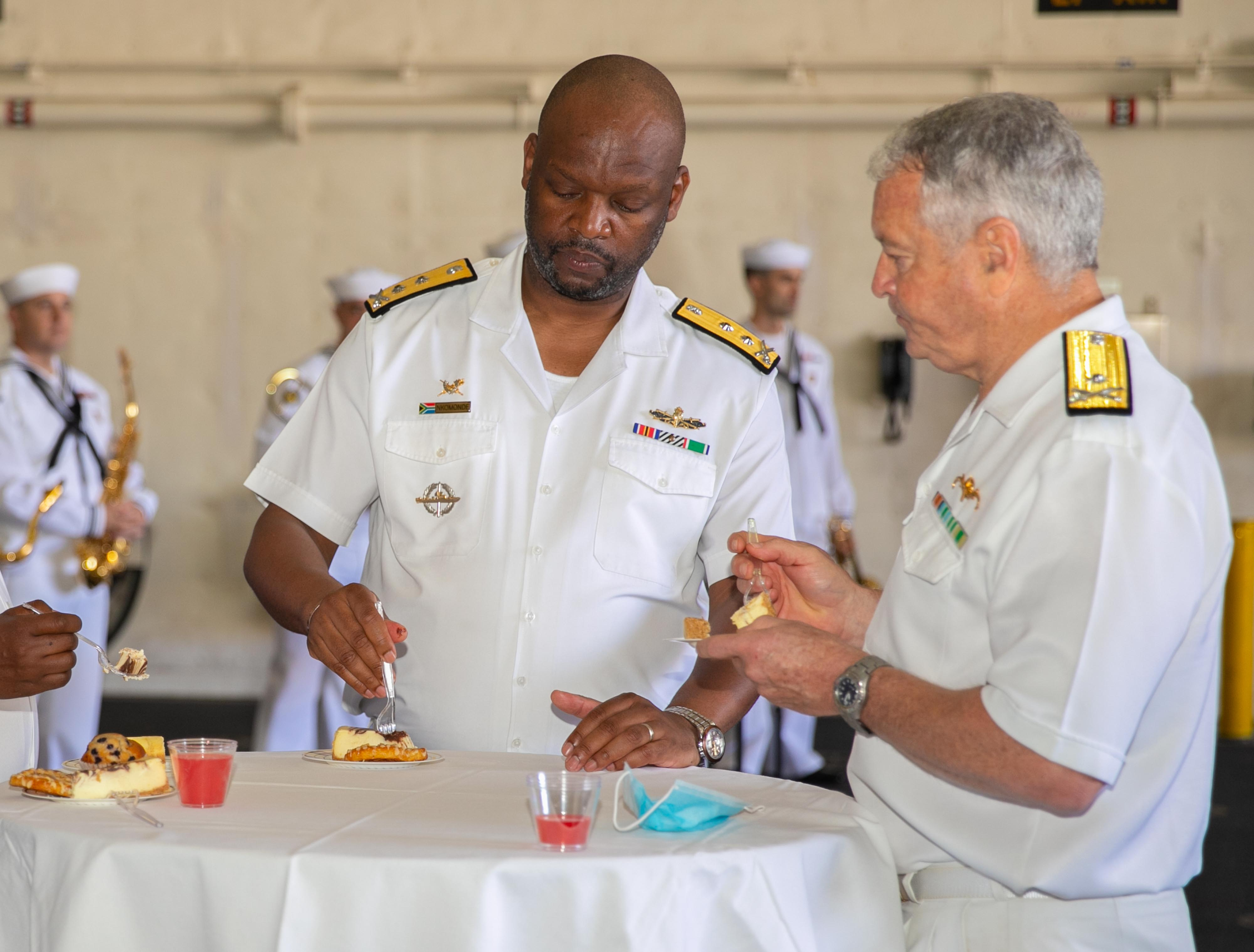
- Nkomonde (left)
- Born: Soweto
- Military career
- Allegiance: South Africa
- Branch: South African Navy
- Service years: 1997
- Rank: Rear Admiral
- Commands: Chief Director Maritime Strategy; Flag Officer Fleet; Inspector General of the Navy; SAS Isandlwana

Rear Admiral Musawenkosi Nkomonde is a South African naval officer.

== Background ==
He joined the Navy in 1997 after school. After military training he attended the South African Military Academy where he earned a BSc degree.

He then completed combat training before joining SAS Fleur as a gunnery officer and later navigation officer. He joined SAS Umzimkulu as a navigation officer before attending International Mine Warfare Course for Commanders in HMS Collingwood in 2004.

He was appointed Officer Commanding of SAS Umkomaas in September 2007 and of the frigate SAS Isandlwana in June 2011. On 1 April 2017 he was appointed Inspector General of the Navy and promoted to Rear Admiral. He was appointed Flag Officer Fleet on 1 June 2020 until being appointed Chief Director Maritime Strategy in November 2024.

Military offices
Preceded by Bubele Mhlana	Flag Officer Fleet; 2020 –	Succeeded by Handsome Matsane
Preceded by David Mkhonto	Chief Director Maritime Strategy; 2024 –	Incumbent
