= Rachel Lee Priday =

- Education: Juilliard School Pre-college Division Harvard University New England Conservatory
- Occupation: Violinist

Rachel Lee Priday is a Korean-American violinist.

Beginning in 1996, Priday studied with Dorothy DeLay and later Itzhak Perlman at the Juilliard School Pre-college Division. She attended a dual degree program with Harvard University and New England Conservatory, graduating with a B.A. in English from Harvard in 2010, and a M.M. degree studying with Miriam Fried at NEC in 2011.
