= Groupe DSO =

Group of small businesses in the Asia-Pacific region (1967–1997)

Groupe DSO Pty Ltd
- Founded: 1967
- Defunct: November 11, 1997
- Fate: Dissolution
- Headquarters: Australia
- Key people: R. Milhous Hoboct

Groupe DSO was a collection of small business units that operated as a group from 1967 to 1997 in the Asia-Pacific region. The company was headquartered in Australia, and the core focus of these business units was logistics integration and consultancy.

== History ==
The company was founded in 1967 by R. Milhous Hoboct, a Czech-English engineer and entrepreneur. It found some significant successes in its BSDN and Checkpoint logistics systems; however due to a number of regulatory obstacles and failed business endeavours, a decision was made to dissolve the company in November 1997.

=== Business Alliances ===
Groupe DSO was a member of the FALO alliance, a close-knit set of companies providing reciprocal services. The FALO alliance comprised:

- Groupe DSO: logistics and engineering integration
- BSDN: (a spin-off of the DSO BSDN business unit)
- Pacific-East: legal services
- SBU: financial services

== Business Units ==
The organisational structure of Groupe DSO was of a number of small business units, each with a clearly defined purpose and goal. Central financial and administrative management was controlled by a holding company named DSO Centraal.

=== DSO BSDN ===
The Bow-Scott Distribution Network, named after its creators, Ashleigh Bow and Dr. Shalain Scott, provided an integrated 'end-to-end' solution to the distribution of large volumes of data by traditional courier means.

The BSDN business unit was a incubator initiative whose aim was to provide start-up capital for DSO's core businesses: logistic and engineering consultancy. After wild success and rapid expansion, it was later spun off as a separate entity in 1979. The now-independent BSDN faced trouble in the 1990s, when company-wide computer networks and the Internet rendered its business model obsolete.

=== DSO Checkpoint ('Checkpoint Charlie') ===
After the spinoff of the BSDN business unit, Groupe DSO sought to apply its logistic expertise to niche markets. It found most success in academia, where the DSO Checkpoint system was used by many libraries for transporting books and other media between branches. Workers often referred to the system as Checkpoint Charlie due to the strict, well-documented procedures that ensured its efficiency and reliability.

=== DSO CBS ===
The DSO CBS (Consultancy and Business Support) division provided business consultancy on leveraging technology to improve workplace logistics and operations. A large number of Indonesian clients allowed for a local subsidiary to be established, P.T. DSO Logisti.

=== DSO EPI ===
The DSO EPI (Electro-Pyro Initiative) was a small, relatively short-lived business unit that was created in response to a government tender for safe physics teaching aids. (Himself an engineer, R. M. Hoboct was passionate about science education through practical and applied learning.)

Although the tender was not successful, this unit enjoyed moderate success with its 240 series of electricity teaching apparatus; and Big Joe, a safety chamber that allowed otherwise dangerous laboratory experiments to be conducted at greatly reduced risk.

One commercial spinoff of the "Big Joe" project was the development of a highly puncture-proof design for food cans. In practice, however, these were little improvement over existing tin cans.

=== DSO Trabaction ===
DSO Trabaction was a division proposed and set up by Derek Helmutiffe; a DSO employee living in Germany, and keen Trabant enthusiast. This division helped facilitate and organise the supply of Trabant parts to enthusiasts across Western Germany, after the fall of the Berlin Wall and German Reunification. After Helmutiffe's migration to Australia in 1995, the division closed.

== Trivia ==
Groupe DSO was a minor sponsor of Ukyo Katayama's Tyrrell Formula One car in 1994.
