= Dubuque Symphony Orchestra =

Orchestra in Iowa, U.S.

The Dubuque Symphony Orchestra is a non-union, fully professional orchestra located in Dubuque, Iowa. It serves the residents of Dubuque and its surrounding tri-state area which includes 12 counties in Iowa, Illinois and Wisconsin. Under Music Director William Intriligator, over 75 professional musicians perform a repertoire of classical, chamber, opera and pops concerts each year. The DSO performs an average of 12 different concerts a year with a total of 25 performances.

== History ==
Although its antecedents may be traced as far back as 1903, the Dubuque Symphony Orchestra, as currently structured, was organized in 1958 as the “University Civic Symphony” under the auspices of the University of Dubuque. The name was changed to the Dubuque Symphony Orchestra in 1974 to reflect the organization's mission to serve the entire community.

More than 40 years ago, the orchestra presented five concerts yearly under the baton of founding music director and Conductor Dr. Parviz Mahmoud. Dr. Mahmoud had been conductor of the Tehran Symphony and head of the Iranian Administrators of Music and Iranian Radio Broadcasts. He earned his Master of Music degree in composition and a Ph.D. in theory at the prestigious School of Music at Northwestern University. Under his directorship, the DSO grew in size and prestige through Dr. Mahmoud's retirement in 1985.

In that year, Nicholas Palmer was selected as the DSO's second music director and conductor. Under Maestro Palmer's direction, the orchestra continued to grow steadily in size, ticket sales and public support. The number of concerts performed increased from five in the 1985–1986 season to 27 in the 1991–1992 season. Maestro Palmer was named conductor emeritus of the Dubuque Symphony Orchestra in 1999 in recognition of his service to the orchestra.

During the 1999–2000 season the DSO conducted a nationwide search to fill Maestro Palmer's position. The board of directors together with the patrons of the DSO, overwhelmingly chose William Intriligator to be the third music director and conductor of the Dubuque Symphony Orchestra. Under Maestro Intriligator's leadership the DSO has experienced tremendous growth and success—attracting new audiences and musicians, adding opera productions to the season, launching a chamber series, doubling the number of education concerts and forging new partnerships in the community.

Around the same time, the DSO realized change was needed in its staff and board. The staff added several new positions: director of marketing, director of development, and bookkeeper. For its top administrative executive, the board sought and engaged new executive directors with experience and expertise.

In 1969 the Dubuque Symphony Orchestra organized the Dubuque Youth Symphony Orchestra (DYSO). The goal of the youth symphony was to assist in the development of young musicians who could eventually graduate to the DSO. The DYSO consists of 50 of the area's best student musicians from as far away as Prairie du Chien, Wisconsin. In 1993 the program was expanded to include the Dubuque Youth String Ensemble (DYSE), a smaller training ensemble for less experienced string players.

The Dubuque Symphony Orchestra Auxiliary was formed in 1966 to assist with the financial support of the symphony. The name was changed to the Dubuque Symphony Orchestra League (DSOL) in 1986. The League sponsors events throughout the year to raise funds for the DSO and to provide educational opportunities for tri-state area residents. Currently, the League has over 120 members.

== Music directors ==
- William Intriligator (2000–)
- Nicholas Palmer (1985–1999)
- Parviz Mahmoud (1957–1985)

== Musicians ==
The DSO employs approximately 60 professional musicians on a yearly contract, while the rest of the orchestra consists of substitute players. Roughly one-fifth of the contract musicians are local while the remainder travel from larger metropolitan areas like Chicago, Madison, Milwaukee, Des Moines, Iowa City and the Quad Cities. Orchestra musicians audition behind a screen so that their identity is unknown to the judges, and the only consideration in their appointment to the orchestra is their musical ability. Musicians have only about 3 weeks before the concert to study and rehearse the music, then rehearse together for just 10½ hours before each concert.

== Youth ensembles ==
The DSO sponsors four different youth orchestra training programs for young instrumentalists, the [Dubuque Symphony Youth Orchestra] (DSYO)[Dubuque Youth Wind Ensemble] (DYWE), the [Dubuque Youth Philharmonia] (DYP), and the Dubuque Youth String Ensemble (DYSE). Students audition annually to become members.

=== Dubuque Youth String Ensemble ===
The Dubuque Youth String Ensemble (DYSE) is an introductory honors ensemble for young string players. The ensemble focuses on developing string technique, ensemble skills, and gaining performance experience. Musicians participating in the DYSE will focus on chamber orchestra music as a tool to develop advanced string technique and ensemble skills. Musicians performing in the Dubuque Youth String Orchestra generally have 2–4 years of playing experience.

=== Dubuque Youth Wind Ensemble ===
The Dubuque Youth Wind Ensemble (DYWE) is an intermediate honors ensemble for wind, brass and percussion players. The ensemble focuses on developing wind / percussion technique, ensemble skills, and gaining performance experience. Musicians participating in the DYWE will focus on advanced middle school to high school repertoire to further advanced ensemble skills, and prepare for performing in a full orchestra setting. Musicians performing in the Dubuque Youth Wind Ensemble generally have 3–5 years of playing experience.

=== Dubuque Youth Philharmonia ===
The Dubuque Youth Philharmonia is an intermediate honors ensemble for young string players. The ensemble focuses on advancing string technique, ensemble skills, and gaining performance experience. Musicians participating in the DYP will focus on advanced middle school to high school chamber orchestra music to develop advanced string technique and ensemble skills, and prepare for performing in a full orchestra setting. Musicians performing in the Dubuque Youth Philharmonia generally have 3–6 years of playing experience.

=== Dubuque Youth Symphony Orchestra ===
The Dubuque Youth Symphony (DYSO) was founded in 1968 as a feeder ensemble for the Dubuque Symphony Orchestra. Today the ensemble exists as an honors youth orchestra for students living in the Dubuque area. Musicians in the Dubuque Youth Symphony Orchestra gain experience performing standard classical repertoire in a full orchestra setting.

== Notable musicians ==
=== Piano ===
- Bruce Brubaker, piano 1993
- Robert Taub, piano 2000 and 2002
- Radoslav Kvapil, piano 1997
- Navah Perlman, piano 2002
- Antonio Pompa-Baldi, piano 2005
- Jon Nakamatsu, piano 2005

=== Violin ===
- Lynn Chang, violin 1980
- Benny Kim, violin 1984
- Rachel Lee, violin 2002
- Robert McDuffie, violin 1985
- Jennifer Koh, violin 1993, 1995
- Judith Ingolfsson, violin 2006
- Mark O'Connor, violin and composer 1997, 2007

=== Cello ===
- Mark Kosower, cello 1996
- Zuill Bailey, cello 2005

=== Other ===
- George Zukerman, bassoon, 1996
