= Dobbertin Surface Orbiter =

Amphibious vehicle

The Dobbertin Surface Orbiter is an amphibious vehicle designed and built by Rick Dobbertin in the early 1990s. The DSO started out from a 1959 Heil milk tank trailer and was modified by Dobbertin over the course of 4 1/2 years.

On February 23, 1995, the DSO became the first car to transit the Panama Canal.
