= Dark Sky Observatory =

Observatory in North Carolina, US

- Organization: Appalachian State University
- Location: Deep Gap, North Carolina
- Coordinates: 36.2514°N 81.4121°W
- Altitude: 932 meters (3,058 ft)
- Established: 1981
- Website: Dark Sky Observatory

Telescopes
- 32-inch Telescope: 0.82 m reflector
- 18-inch Telescope: 0.45 m reflector
- Dean Glace Telescope: 0.43 m reflector
- 14-inch Telescope: 0.35 m reflector
- Related media on Commons

The Dark Sky Observatory (DSO) is an astronomical observatory owned and operated by Appalachian State University (ASU). It is located 9 kilometers (5.6 miles) east of Deep Gap, North Carolina (USA), off of the Blue Ridge Parkway, and 32 kilometers (20 miles) east of the ASU campus in Boone, North Carolina It was established in 1981, and is used for research, instruction, and public viewing events. The Cline Visitors' Center was completed in 2011.

== Telescopes ==
- A 32 in (0.81 m) Ritchey–Chrétien telescope was built by DFM Engineering, as was the equatorial fork mount. It is the primary research tool at the observatory.
- A 18 in (0.46 m) Cassegrain telescope on a German equatorial mount was installed in 1981. It is used to monitor eclipsing binary stars and was once used to observe Mira variable stars.
- The 17 in (0.43 m) Dean Glace Telescope is a corrected Dall-Kirkham telescope made by Planewave and set on a Mathis equatorial fork mount. It is shared between ASU and astrophotographer Dean Glace, who donated the telescope.
- A 14 in (0.36 m) C-14 Schmidt-Cassegrain Celestron reflector. The 14-inch remote robotic telescope, DSO-14, was assembled by Adam Smith for his Master's thesis project in 2009. It is automatically controlled by the Skynet Robotic Telescope Network in coordination with UNC-Chapel Hill. As well as offering queue-scheduled observing to both scientists and the general public, it is automatically commanded to observe the optical afterglows of Gamma-ray bursts within seconds of notification from the Swift Gamma-Ray Burst Mission.

=== Former telescopes ===
- A 16 in (0.41 m) reflecting telescope built by DFM Engineering was originally located at the Rankin Science Center on the ASU campus in Boone. It was moved to DSO in 2003 while the building was being refurbished. It was installed in the Rankin Science Observatory (RSO) on the roof of the building in 2005, where it is used for undergraduate instruction.
- A 16 in (0.41 m) Newtonian telescope was donated to ASU in 1982, and was permanently mounted in its own dome in 1985. It was unused for several years before being removed in 2003.

== See also ==
- Pisgah Astronomical Research Institute
- Scottish Dark Sky Observatory
- List of astronomical observatories
