= Distinguished Service Order (Argentina) =

The Distinguished Service Order (Spanish: "Orden a los Servicios Distinguidos") is the highest decoration in the Argentine military. There is a Military Merit Order and a Civilian Merit Order.

The naval version is called the Spanish: "Cruz Naval a Los Servicios Distinguidos"

Grades:

- Grand Cross (Spanish: Gran Cruz)
- Commander (Spanish: Comendador)
- Knight (Spanish: Caballero)
