= Naval Base Simon's Town =

Naval base in Cape Town, South Africa

Naval Base Simonstown
- Near Simon's Town in South Africa
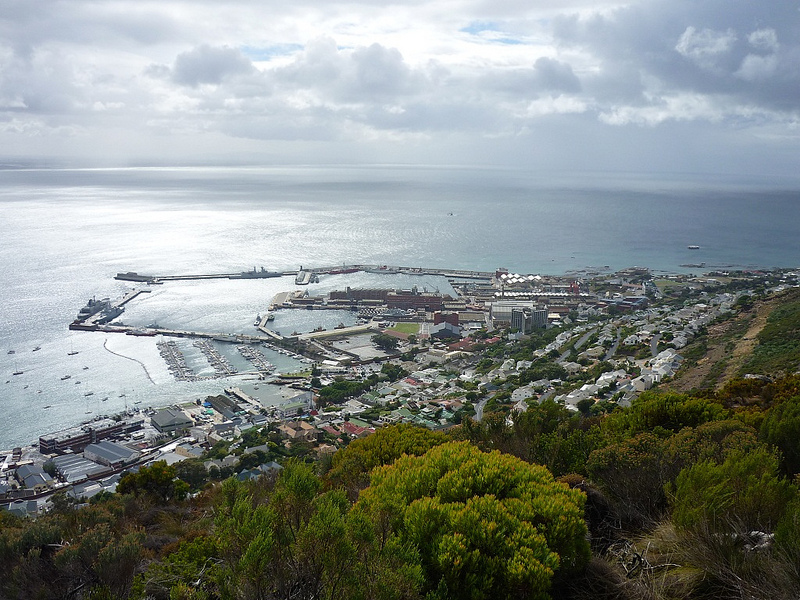
- A view of Simonstown and the naval base

Site information
- Type: Naval base
- Owner: Department of Defence (South Africa)
- Operator: South African Navy
- Controlled by: South African National Defence Force
- Condition: Active
- Website: South African Naval Museum, Simon's Town

Location
- Location within the South African Western Cape
- Coordinates: 34°10′59″S 18°25′59″E

Site history
- Built: 1743

Naval Base Simonstown is the South African Navy's largest naval base, situated in the City of Cape Town Metropolitan Municipality, Western Cape. The base provides support functions to Fleet Command.

== History ==
A small dockyard facility was first established in Simon's Town by the Dutch East India Company in 1743. This was taken over by the British Royal Navy (RN) in the 1790s, under whom the facility was further developed over the following century and a half. A pair of handsome stone storehouses dating from the 1740s stand on the seafront where they were built by the Dutch East India Company, marking the initial location of the Yard. Immediately adjacent is the earliest Royal Naval building on the site: a combined mast-house, boathouse and sail loft; dating from 1815, it now serves as the South African Naval Museum.

Over the next few decades, the site was developed gradually, with steam engineering and coaling facilities being added mid-century. In 1885, the government of the Cape Colony transferred the assets of the Simon's Bay Dock and Patent Slip Company to the British Admiralty. By the close of the century, however, it became clear that more space would be needed to accommodate the requirements of a modern Navy. In 1898, a large site was acquired to the east of the original Yard for a dockyard extension. Sir John Jackson and Co Ltd. were chosen to do the work.

Construction began in 1900. The new harbour encompassed an area of 11 hectares, with a breakwater of 914 metres (3,000 ft) in length. It also contained a drydock 240 metres (790 ft) long and 29 metres (95 ft) wide, with a sizeable steam factory constructed alongside. The drydock was named the Selborne Graving Dock after the Earl of Selborne, the High Commissioner of the Cape. Work on the Simon's Town dockyard was completed in 1910.

The naval base was handed over to South Africa in 1957 under the Simonstown Agreement.

The Dockyard was expanded in 1975, a large area of land was reclaimed and the harbour walls were extended to form a new Tidal Basin.

In December 2022 Lady R, a Russian cargo ship, docked at Simon's Town Naval Base. It was alleged by the United States ambassador to South Africa that South African military supplies were loaded onto the ship for use in Russia's invasion of Ukraine. This situation became known as the Lady R incident. It has been reported the Ukrainian GUR discovered what was going on and passed the information to the United States.

== Current status ==
As of December 2015, it is the main base of the South African Navy, and home port of the frigate and submarine flotillas. The base also houses training facilities for the frigates and submarines. In December 2015, Naval Base Durban in Durban harbour was redesignated back to a fully fledged naval base and home port of the offshore patrol flotilla. City of Cape Town Metropolitan Municipality

== Gallery ==
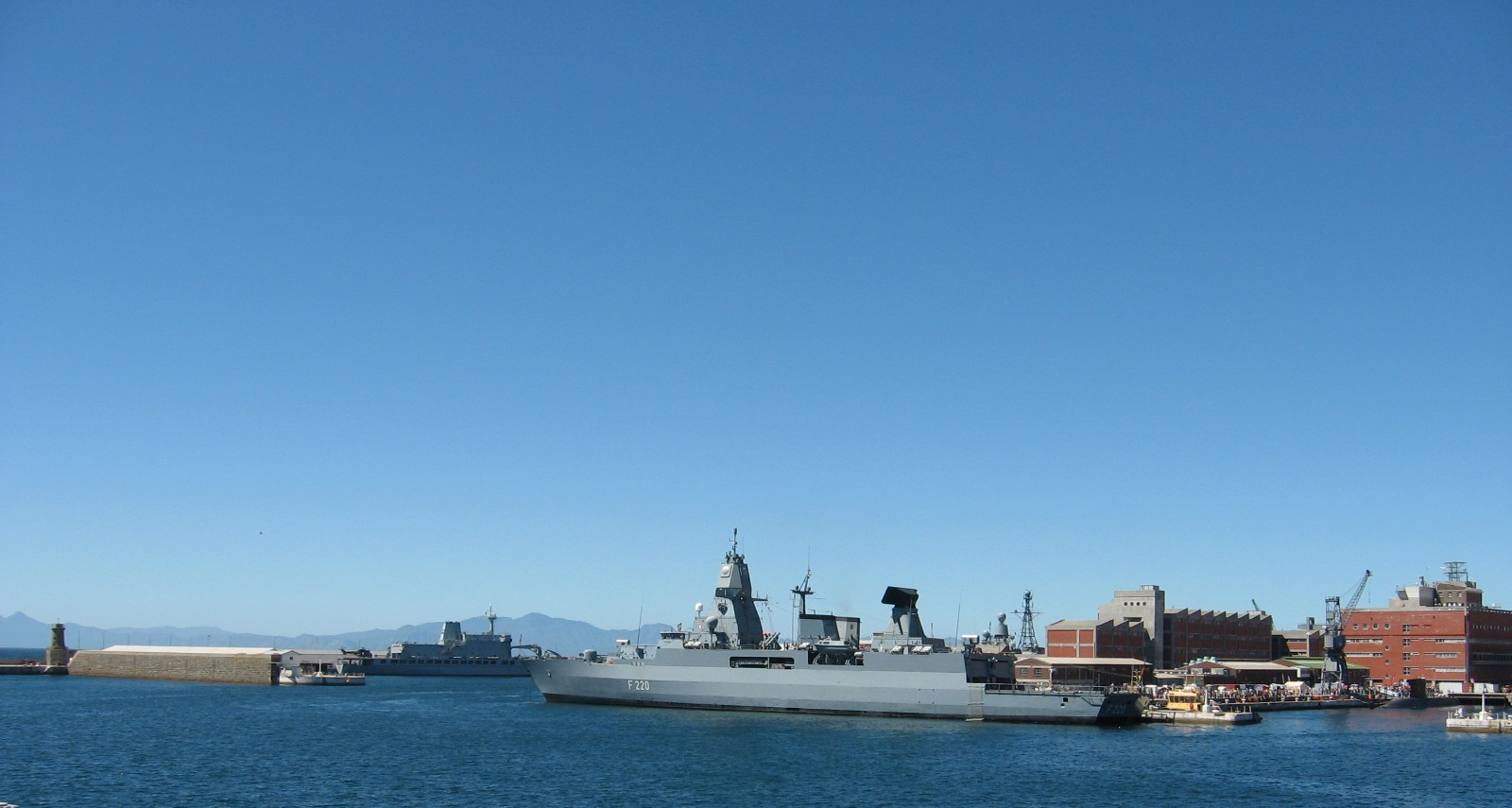
Naval Base Simon's Town from the sea.

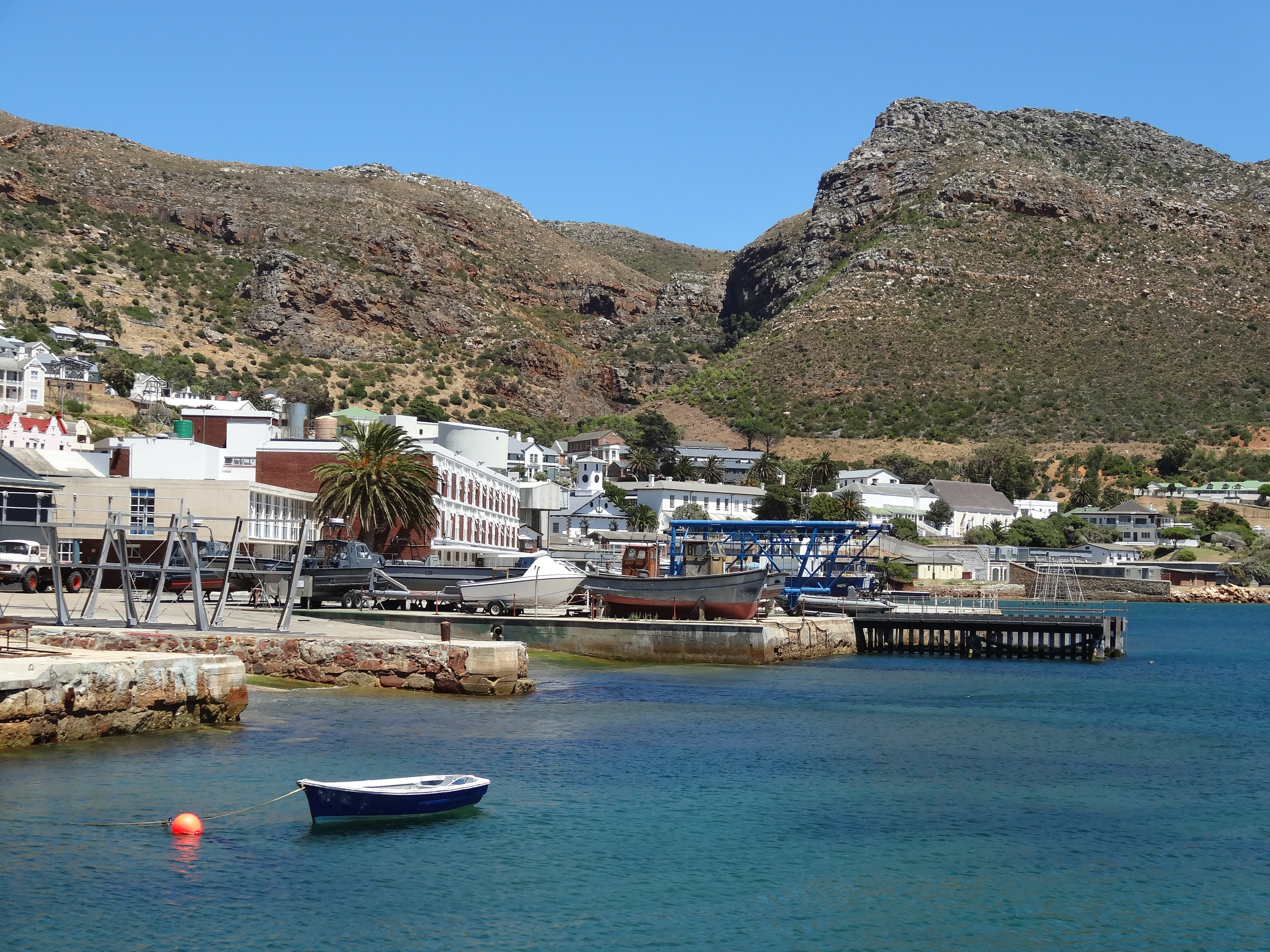
Site of the 18th-century dockyard.

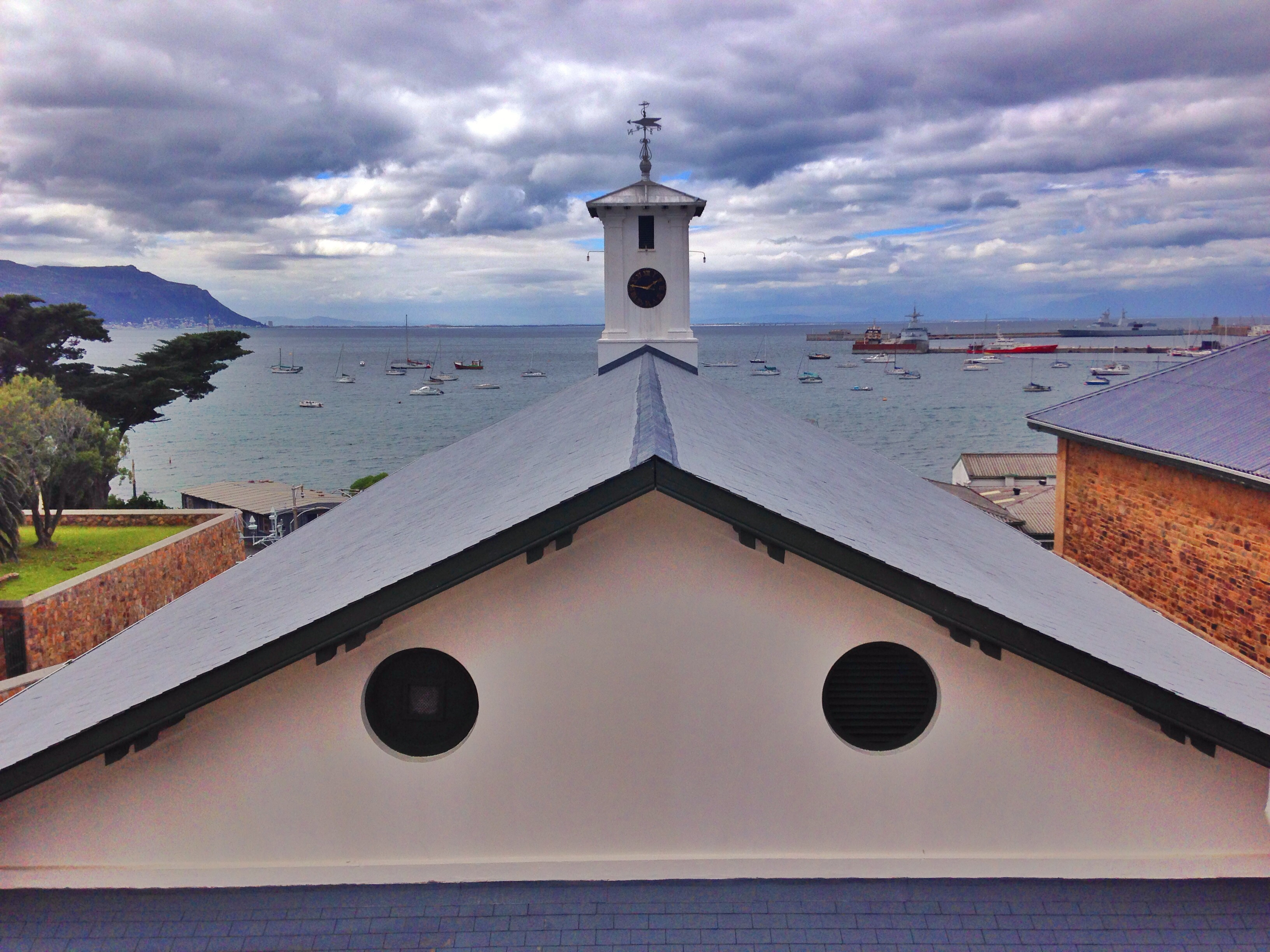
Mast House & Sail Loft, West Yard, 1815.

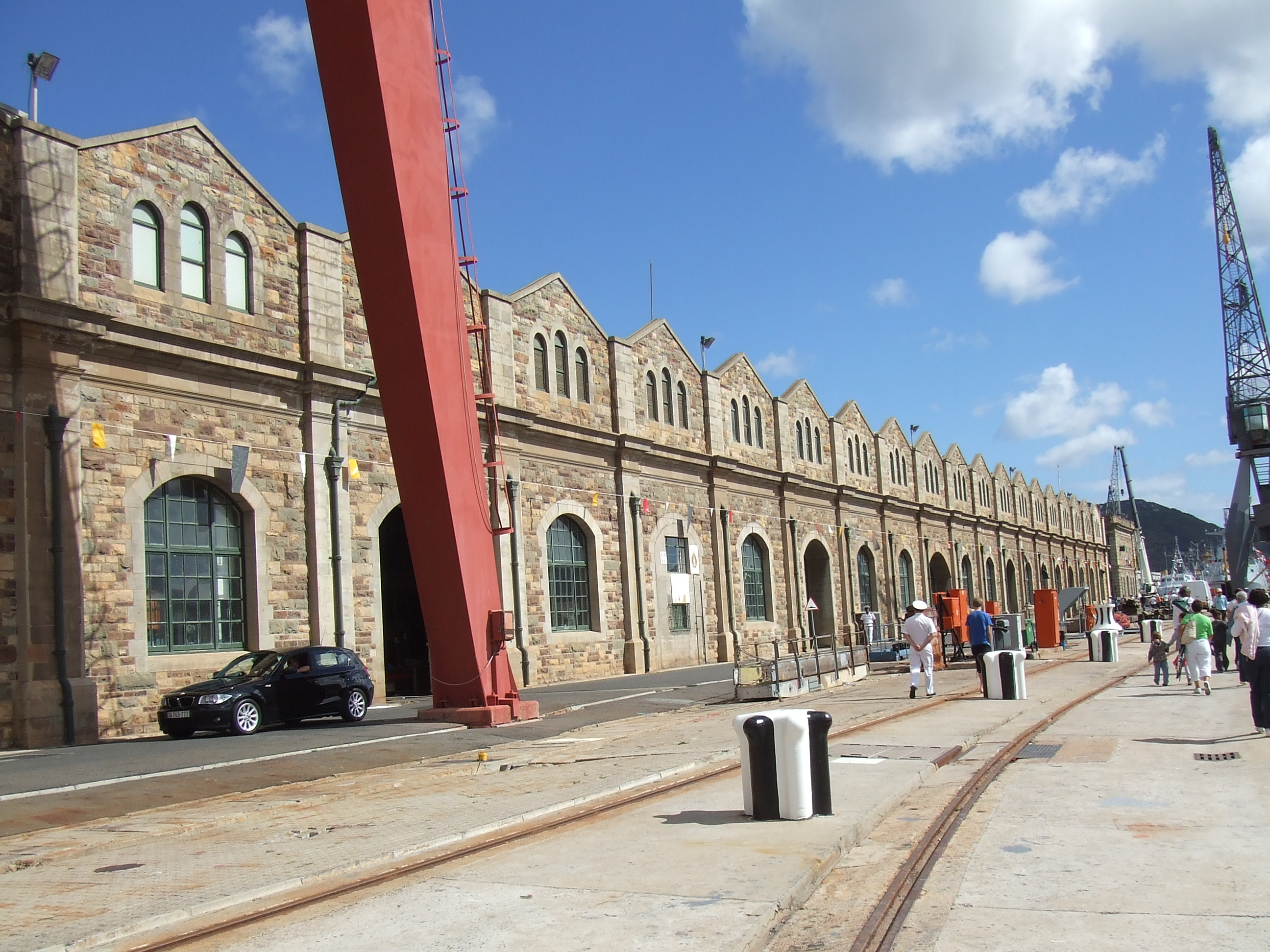
Main Factory, East Yard, completed 1910.

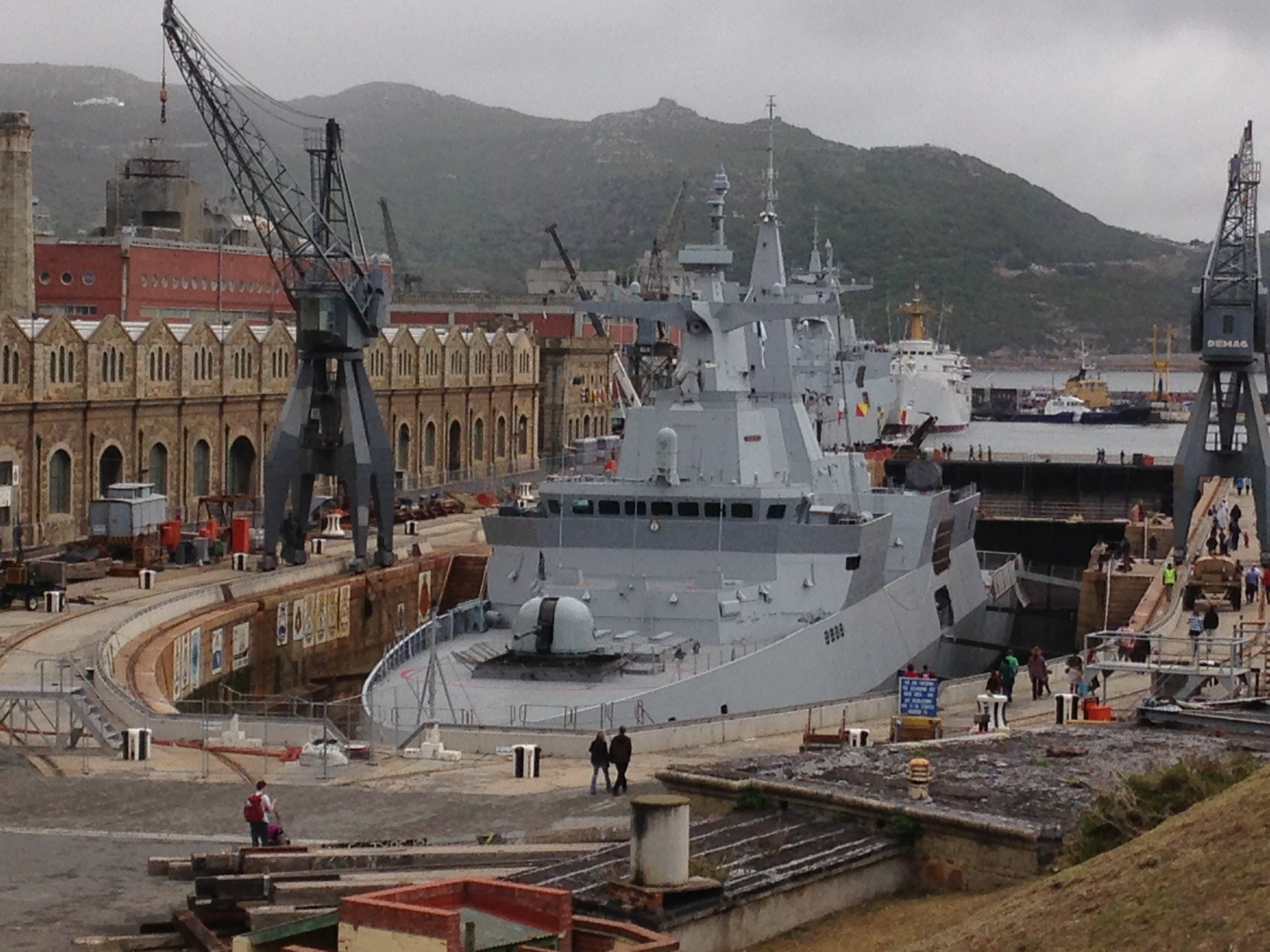
Selborne Graving dock in use, 2013.

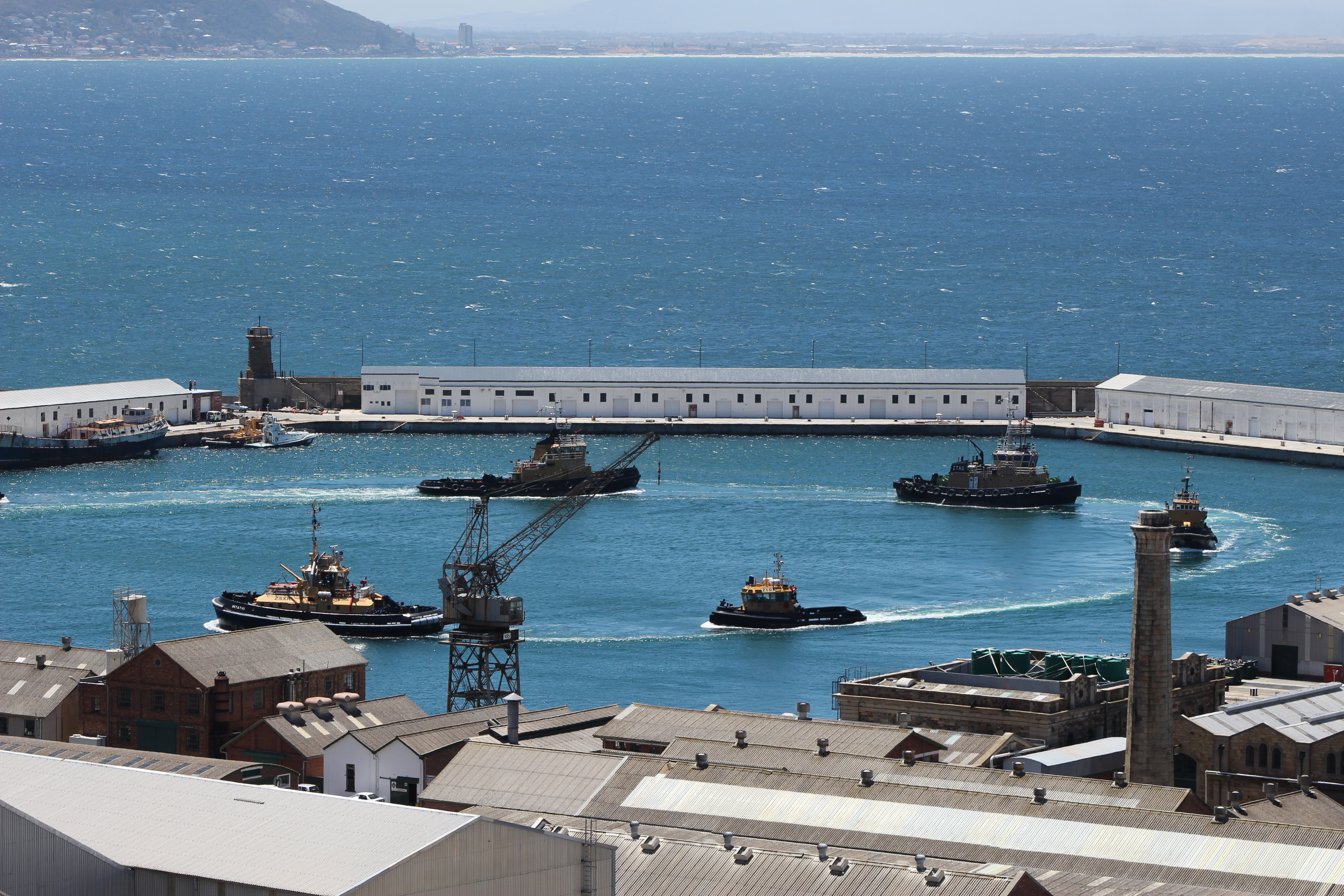
South African naval tugs welcoming a new tug in 2016.
