= South African Naval College =

Officer training to the South African Navy

Coordinates: 34.1635°S 18.8616°E

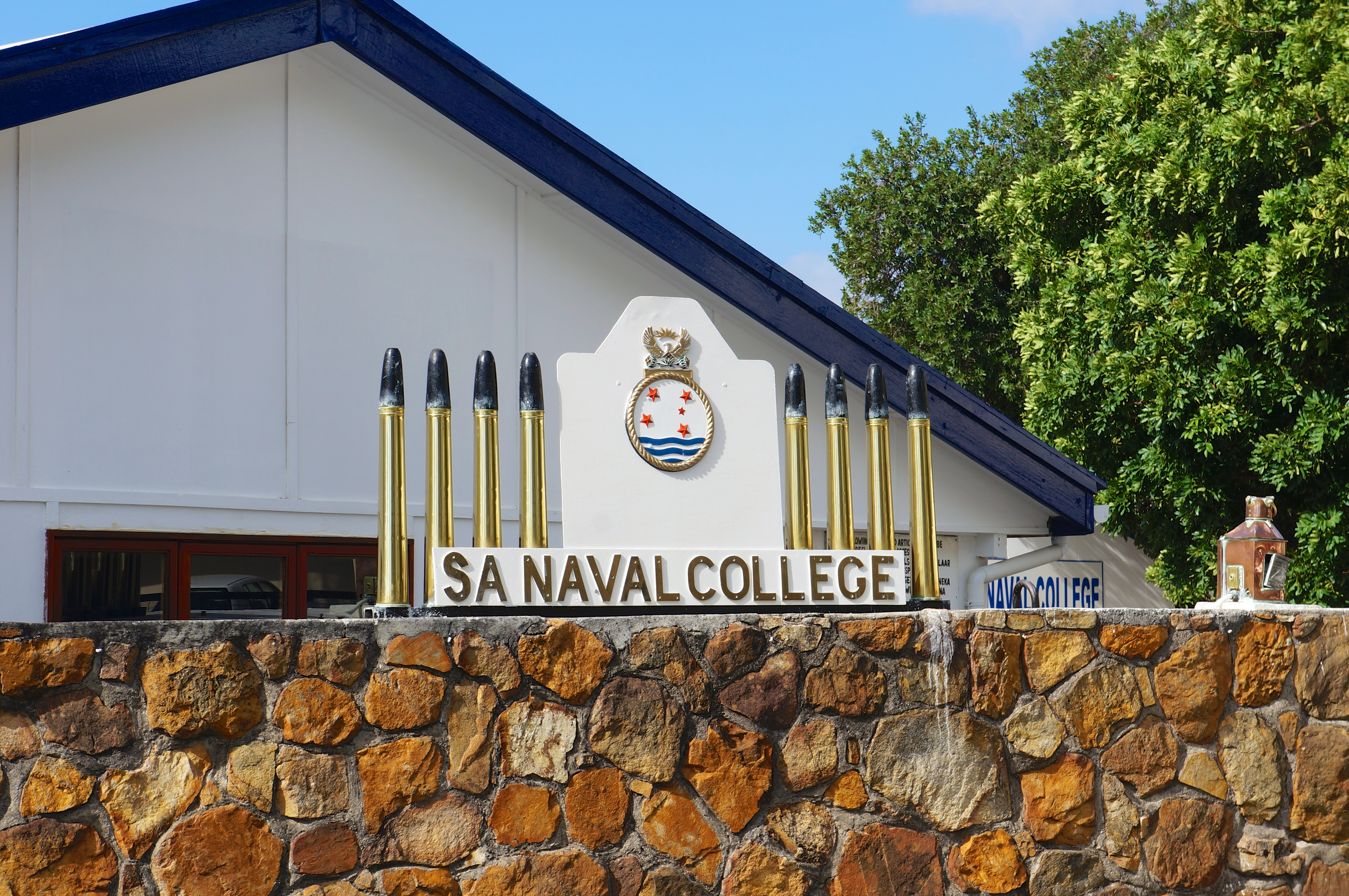
Outside of College

The South African Naval College provides naval officer training to the South African Navy and is one of three officer training institutions within the South African National Defence Force, the equivalent of the Air Force Gymnasium and the Army Gymnasium

== History ==
=== SATS General Botha ===
HMS Thames was a Mersey-class cruiser launched in 1885 for the Royal Navy. Thomas Benjamin Frederick Davis was a wealthy businessman, yachtsman and philanthropist. In 1920 Davis bought the Thames from the British Admiralty and sent her to South Africa. He donated the ship to the South African government and stipulated that it had to be used for the full-time training of boys for careers at sea. It was renamed TS (training ship) General Botha in honour of the South African prime minister. She was moored in Simon's Bay, outside the naval dockyard.

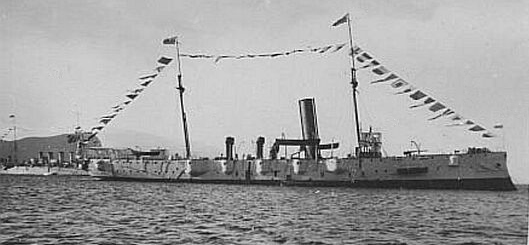
TS General Botha in 1925

On 15 March 1922 the first intake of seventy five boys joined ship in Simon's Bay. General Botha's wife was supposed to conduct the official christening, but she was feeling poorly, with the result that Isie Smuts had to officiate on 1 April 1922. The TS General Botha remained in Simon's Bay for the next twenty years, during which 1,276 cadets received their training. The presence of German submarines in the southern oceans in 1942 caused the naval authorities to become concerned for the safety of the cadets living on board the TS General Botha. They were therefore moved up to Red Hill, but still went down to the ship for their daily training. At the end of the year the TS General Botha was commandeered by the navy and berthed in the dockyard for the rest of the war.

After the war it was found that the TS General Botha was beyond economical repair. On 13 May 1947 she was towed into False Bay to a position nine nautical miles ESE of the Roman Rock lighthouse and sunk by gunfire from Scala battery.

=== The South African Nautical College General Botha ===
At the end of April 1948 the cadets were moved to the former SAAF crash boat station at Gordons Bay. The name of the establishment was changed to The South African Nautical College General Botha and the new Captain-Superintendent was Captain G V Legassick RNR. For the next 10 years General Botha prospered. A new engineering course was introduced as well. Then in 1958 the government decided to place the establishment under the control of the South African Navy.

=== South African Naval College ===
Captain Legassick was replaced with Commander SC Biermann, on whom rested the unenviable job of combining the courses for the Merchant Marine and the Navy, while remaining the commanding officer of the Naval Gymnasium in Saldanha. This difficult relationship between the two services continued until 1966, when the new South African Merchant Navy Academy was established at Granger Bay.
