= General Service Medal (South Africa) =

- Type: Military campaign medal
- Awarded for: Operational service inside South Africa from 1 January 1983
- Country: South Africa
- Presented by: the State President and, from 1994, the President
- Eligibility: All Ranks
- Campaign: 1985-1992 State of Emergency
- Clasps: MALUTI
- Status: Discontinued in 2003
- Established: 1987
- First award: 1991
- Ribbon bar

SADF pre-1994 & SANDF post-2002 orders of wear
- Next (higher): SADF precedence: Southern Africa Medal; SANDF precedence: Southern Africa Medal
- Next (lower): SADF succession: Queen Elizabeth II Coronation Medal; SANDF succession: Defence Medal

The General Service Medal is a military campaign medal which was instituted by the Republic of South Africa in 1987. It could be awarded to members of the South African Defence Force from 1 January 1983, for operational service inside South Africa in the prevention or suppression of terrorism or internal disorder, or the preservation of life, health or property, or the maintenance of essential services and law and order, or crime prevention.

In 2002, the Maluti Clasp was authorised for personnel who participated in Operations Boleas and Maluti.

== The South African military ==
The Union Defence Forces (UDF) were established in 1912 and renamed the South African Defence Force (SADF) in 1958. On 27 April 1994, it was integrated with six other independent forces into the South African National Defence Force (SANDF).

== Institution ==
The General Service Medal was instituted by the State President in 1987.

== Award criteria ==
The medal could be awarded from 1 January 1983, to serving members of all ranks of the South African Defence Force for operational service inside South Africa in the prevention or suppression of terrorism or internal disorder, or the preservation of life, health or property, or the maintenance of essential services and law and order, or crime prevention. In effect, it also served as a campaign medal for the State of Emergency operations against Umkhonto we Sizwe (MK) and the Azanian People's Liberation Army (APLA) from 1985 to 1990.

Instituted by warrant on 9 May 2002, the Maluti Clasp was authorised for personnel who participated in Operations Boleas and Maluti in Lesotho.

== Order of wear ==
The position of the General Service Medal in the official order of precedence was revised three times after 1987, to accommodate the inclusion or institution of new decorations and medals, first upon the integration into the South African National Defence Force in 1994, again in April 1996, when decorations and medals were belatedly instituted for the two former non-statutory forces, the Azanian People's Liberation Army and Umkhonto we Sizwe, and finally upon the institution of a new set of honours on 27 April 2003, but it remained unchanged, as it was on 27 April 1994, on the latter two occasions.

South African Defence Force until 26 April 1994

- Official SADF order of precedence:
  - Preceded by the Southern Africa Medal.
  - Succeeded by the Queen Elizabeth II Coronation Medal of the United Kingdom.
- Official national order of precedence:
  - Preceded by the Southern Africa Medal.
  - Succeeded by the Queen Elizabeth II Coronation Medal of the United Kingdom.

South African National Defence Force from 27 April 1994

- Official SANDF order of precedence:
  - Preceded by the Southern Africa Medal of the Republic of South Africa.
  - Succeeded by the Defence Medal of the Republic of Ciskei.
- Official national order of precedence:
  - Preceded by the Southern Africa Medal of the Republic of South Africa.
  - Succeeded by the Defence Medal of the Republic of Ciskei.

== Description ==
Obverse

The General Service Medal is a medallion struck in nickel silver, 3 millimetres thick and 38 millimetres in diameter, depicting the castle emblem of the South African Defence Force, partly surrounded by a wreath of leaves.

Reverse

The reverse has the pre-1994 South African coat of arms with the words "GENERAL SERVICE" at left and "ALGEMENE DIENS" at right around the perimeter, with the medal number stamped underneath the coat of arms.

Clasp

Only the Maluti Clasp was authorized, struck in bronze with a hole at each end to allow it to be sewn onto the medal ribbon.

Ribbon

The ribbon is 32 millimetres wide, with a 6 millimetres wide dark blue band, a 2 millimetres wide white band and a 7 millimetres wide orange band, repeated in reverse order and separated by a 2 millimetres wide dark blue band in the centre.

Versions

The first batch of medals had a rough frosted-like surface, while the later version had a more traditional and more attractive smooth surface.

== Mentioned in dispatches ==
A recipient of the General Service Medal who was Mentioned in Dispatches during such operational service inside South Africa, was entitled to wear a miniature coat of arms on the medal ribbon.

== Discontinuation ==
Conferment of the medal was discontinued in respect of services performed on or after 27 April 2003.
