= Unitas Medal =

South African military decoration

- Type: Military commemorative medal
- Awarded for: Commemoration of the establishment of the SANDF
- Country: South Africa
- Presented by: the President
- Eligibility: All ranks on active SANDF strength on 27 April 1994, BMATT personnel
- Status: Discontinued in 1994
- Established: 1994
- First award: 1994
- Final award: 1994
- Ribbon bar

Order of wear
- Next (higher): Military Rule Medal
- Next (lower): Closure Commemoration Medal

The Unitas Medal was instituted by the President of the Republic of South Africa on 4 November 1994. It was awarded to all ranks who were on the active strength of all seven constituent military forces from 27 April 1994 to 10 May 1994, to commemorate their amalgamation into the South African National Defence Force. It was also awarded to personnel of the British Military Advisory and Training Team which served in South Africa at the time.

== The South African military ==
The Union Defence Forces (UDF) were established in 1912 and renamed the South African Defence Force (SADF) in 1958. On 27 April 1994 it was integrated with six other independent forces into the South African National Defence Force (SANDF).

== Institution ==
The Unitas Medal was instituted by the President on 4 November 1994 to commemorate the unification of defence forces and armed forces into the South African National Defence Force (SANDF) on 27 April 1994. The seven constituent military forces were:

- The South African Defence Force (SADF).
- The Transkei Defence Force (TDF) of the Republic of Transkei.
- The Bophuthatswana Defence Force (BDF) of the Republic of Bophuthatswana.
- The Venda Defence Force (VDF) of the Republic of Venda.
- The Ciskei Defence Force (CDF) of the Republic of Ciskei.
- Umkhonto we Sizwe (MK), the military wing of the African National Congress.
- The Azanian People's Liberation Army (APLA), the military wing of the Pan Africanist Congress.

== Award criteria ==
The Unitas Medal was awarded to all ranks who were on the active strength of these seven constituent military forces on 27 April 1994 and until at least 10 May 1994, and also to the President, the Minister of Defence and the Deputy Minister of Defence. Personnel of the British Military Advisory and Training Team (BMATT) who were serving in South Africa at the time, were subsequently also awarded the Unitas Medal.

== Order of wear ==
The position of the Unitas Medal in the official order of precedence was revised on 27 April 2003, when a new set of awards was instituted. It changed again in 2010, when the Closure Commemoration Medal was instituted.

From 27 April 1994

- Official military order of precedence:
  - Preceded by the Military Rule Medal of the Republic of Transkei.
  - Succeeded by the Medal for Distinguished Conduct and Loyal Service of the Republic of South Africa.
- Official national order of precedence:
  - Preceded by the Military Rule Medal of the Republic of Transkei.
  - Succeeded by the Police Service Amalgamation Medal of the Republic of South Africa.

From 27 April 2003

- Official military order of precedence:
  - Preceded by the Military Rule Medal of the Republic of Transkei.
  - Succeeded by the Medalje vir Troue Diens and Bar, 50 years of the Republic of South Africa.
- Official national order of precedence:
  - Preceded by the Military Rule Medal of the Republic of Transkei.
  - Succeeded by the Police Service Amalgamation Medal of the Republic of South Africa.

From 2010

- Official military order of precedence:
  - Preceded by the Military Rule Medal of the Republic of Transkei.
  - Succeeded by the Closure Commemoration Medal of the Republic of South Africa.
- Official national order of precedence:
  - Preceded by the Military Rule Medal of the Republic of Transkei.
  - Succeeded by the Police Service Amalgamation Medal of the Republic of South Africa.

== Description ==
Obverse

The Unitas Medal is a medallion struck in bronze, 38 millimetres in diameter and 3 millimetres thick at the rim, displaying a seven-pointed star, charged with an embossed Greek lower case letter alpha within a circle. The star represents the seven constituent forces which formed the South African National Defence Force.

Reverse

The reverse displays the embellished pre-1994 South African coat of arms above the year inscription "1994" and the word "Unity" in ten official languages around the perimeter, from the top, "BONGWE", "BOTEE", "BUNYE", "EENHEID", "KOPANO", "UBUNYE", "UMANYANO", "UNITY", "VHUTHIHI" and "VUN'WE", all in relief. The medal number is impressed below the coat of arms and the year inscription.

Ribbon

The ribbon is 32 millimetres wide, with an 8 millimetres wide arctic blue band and a 4 millimetres wide white band, repeated in reverse order and separated by an 8 millimetres wide spectrum green band.

== Discontinuation ==
Conferment of the Unitas Medal was discontinued in respect of services performed on or after 10 May 1994 and the medal was officially discontinued on 27 April 2003.
