= List of South African military chiefs =

This article lists the South African military chiefs. From 1958 until the first democratic general election in 1994, the present-day South African National Defence Force (SANDF) was known as the South African Defence Force (SADF). From 1912 to 1958, the South African military was known as the Union Defence Force (UDF).

In terms of section 202(1) of the Constitution of South Africa, the military command of the Defence Force consists of the Chief of the Defence Force plus the Chiefs of the combat arms (Army, Air Force and Navy) as well as

- the Surgeon-General of the South African Military Health Service;
- the Chief of Joint Operations of the Defence Force;
- the Chief of Defence Intelligence;
- the Chief of Human Resources; and
- the Chief of Logistics.

== Head of the Defence Force ==
The Defence Force consists of the Army, Air Force, Navy, and Medical Service (which was renamed Military Health Service in 1998). The Chief of the South African National Defence Force (SANDF) is the senior military commander and the chiefs of the four services, in addition to the chiefs of Joint Operations, Defence Intelligence, and Corporate Staff, report to him. As of June 2021 the Chief of the SANDF is General Rudzani Maphwanya SM, MMM.

=== Chief of the UDF ===
The Union Defence Force (UDF) consisted initially of land forces. An aviation corps was formed in 1915 and replaced by the South African Air Force in 1920. A naval branch was added in 1922, and the South African Division of the Royal Navy Volunteer Reserve was incorporated into it in 1942.

In 1951, the defence forces were reorganised into three distinct combat services: the South African Army, the South African Air Force, and the South African Navy. The organisation was renamed "South African Defence Force" in 1958.

The UDF had no overall commander for the first nine and a half years. From January 1922, the Chief of the General Staff, previously responsible only for the Defence Headquarters staff, was the executive commander of the UDF. The title was changed to 'Commandant General UDF' in September 1956.

No.	Portrait	Chief of the UDF	Took office	Left office	Time in office	Defence branch	Ref.
1	Andries Brink CBE, DTD, DSO	Major General; Andries Brink CBE, DTD, DSO (1877–1947)	1 October 1922	1 May 1933	10 years, 212 days	South African Army	—
2	Sir Pierre van Ryneveld KBE, CB, DSO, MC	General; Sir Pierre van Ryneveld KBE, CB, DSO, MC (1891–1972)	2 May 1933	1 May 1949	15 years, 364 days	South African Air Force	
3	Leonard Beyers	Lieutenant General; Leonard Beyers (1894–1959)	2 May 1949	15 March 1950	317 days	South African Army	—
4	Christiaan du Toit DSO	Lieutenant General; Christiaan du Toit DSO (1901–1982)	16 March 1950	22 September 1956	6 years, 190 days	South African Army	—
5	Hendrik Klopper DSO	General; Hendrik Klopper DSO (1903–1977)	23 September 1956	24 September 1958	2 years, 1 day	South African Army	—
6	Stephen Melville SSA, OBE	General; Stephen Melville SSA, OBE (1904–1977)	25 September 1958	31 October 1958	36 days	South African Air Force	—

=== Chief of the SADF ===
The UDF was renamed 'South African Defence Force' in November 1958. The Commandant General's title was then changed to 'Commandant General SADF'. It was changed to 'Chief of the SADF' in July 1973, after Admiral Hugo Biermann assumed the post the year before. After South Africa's first democratic election, the South African Defence Force (SADF) became the South African National Defence Force (SANDF).

No.	Portrait	Chief of the SADF	Took office	Left office	Time in office	Defence branch	Ref.
1	Stephen Melville SSA, OBE	General; Stephen Melville SSA, OBE (1904–1977)	1 November 1958	31 December 1960	2 years, 60 days	South African Air Force	—
2	Pieter Grobbelaar SSA, DSO	General; Pieter Grobbelaar SSA, DSO (1908–1988)	1 January 1961	31 December 1965	4 years, 364 days	South African Army	—
3	Rudolph Hiemstra SSA, SM	General; Rudolph Hiemstra SSA, SM (1912–2007)	1 January 1966	31 March 1972	6 years, 90 days	South African Air Force	—
4	Hugo Biermann SSA, SD, OBE, GCIH	Admiral; Hugo Biermann SSA, SD, OBE, GCIH (1916–2012)	1 April 1972	31 August 1976	4 years, 152 days	South African Navy	—
5	Magnus Malan SSA, OMSG, SD, SM	General; Magnus Malan SSA, OMSG, SD, SM (1930–2011)	1 September 1976	6 October 1980	4 years, 35 days	South African Army	—
6	Constand Viljoen SSA, SD, SOE, SM, MMM, ORB	General; Constand Viljoen SSA, SD, SOE, SM, MMM, ORB (1933–2020)	7 October 1980	30 October 1985	5 years, 23 days	South African Army	
7	Johannes Geldenhuys SSAS, SD, SOE, SM, GCIH, ORB	General; Johannes Geldenhuys SSAS, SD, SOE, SM, GCIH, ORB (1935–2018)	1 November 1985	31 October 1990	4 years, 364 days	South African Army	—
8	Andreas Liebenberg SSAS, SD, SOE, SM, MMM	General; Andreas Liebenberg SSAS, SD, SOE, SM, MMM (1938–1998)	1 November 1990	31 October 1993	2 years, 364 days	South African Army	—
9	Georg Meiring SSAS, SD, SM, MMM, ORB	General; Georg Meiring SSAS, SD, SM, MMM, ORB (1939–2024)	1 November 1993	27 April 1994	177 days	South African Army	—

=== Chief of the SANDF ===
The SADF amalgamated with the Azanian People's Liberation Army (APLA), uMkhonto weSizwe (MK), and the homeland defence forces to form the South African National Defence Force in 1994. The SANDF was based on the existing SADF structure of Army, Air Force, Navy, and Medical Service (which was renamed Military Health Service in 1998).

No.	Portrait	Chief of the SANDF	Took office	Left office	Time in office	Defence branch	Ref.
1	Georg Meiring SSAS, SD, SM, MMM, ORB	General; Georg Meiring SSAS, SD, SM, MMM, ORB (1939–2024)	27 April 1994	31 May 1998	4 years, 34 days	South African Army	—
2	Siphiwe Nyanda SSA, SBS, CLS, DMG, MMS, MMM	General; Siphiwe Nyanda SSA, SBS, CLS, DMG, MMS, MMM (born 1950)	1 June 1998	31 May 2005	6 years, 364 days	South African Army	—
3	Godfrey Ngwenya SBG, DMG, MMS, LOM (USA)	General; Godfrey Ngwenya SBG, DMG, MMS, LOM (USA) (born 1950)	1 June 2005	1 May 2011	5 years, 334 days	South African Army	—
4	Solly Shoke OMBG, SBS, MMS, OMS	General; Solly Shoke OMBG, SBS, MMS, OMS (born 1956)	2 May 2011	30 May 2021	10 years, 28 days	South African Army	
5	Rudzani Maphwanya SM, MMM	General; Rudzani Maphwanya SM, MMM (born 1960)	1 June 2021	Incumbent	5 years, 140 days	South African Army	

== Chief of the Army ==
The Chief of the South African Army is the professional head of the Army. There was no separate army commander until 1948. The post was called 'Director-General of Land Forces' 1948–51 and 'Army Chief of Staff' 1951–66, and has been 'Chief of the Army' since 1966.

No.	Portrait	Chief of the Army	Took office	Left office	Time in office	Ref.
1	Christiaan du Toit DSO	Brigadier; Christiaan du Toit DSO (1901–1982)	10 November 1948	15 March 1950	1 year, 125 days	
2	Hendrik Klopper DSO	Brigadier; Hendrik Klopper DSO (1903–1977)	16 March 1950	30 April 1953	3 years, 45 days	
3	Pieter Grobbelaar SSA, DSO	Major General; Pieter Grobbelaar SSA, DSO (1908–1988)	1 May 1953	24 September 1958	5 years, 146 days	
4	Nick Bierman SSA, SM, CBE	Major General; Nick Bierman SSA, SM, CBE (1910–1977)	25 September 1958	31 October 1959	1 year, 36 days	
5	Sybrand Engelbrecht SM	Major General; Sybrand Engelbrecht SM (1913–1994)	1 November 1959	3 March 1963	3 years, 122 days	
6	Petrus Jacobs SSA, SM	Major General; Petrus Jacobs SSA, SM (1910–1967)	4 March 1963	31 December 1965	2 years, 302 days	
7	Charles 'Pop' Fraser SSA, SM	Lieutenant General; Charles 'Pop' Fraser SSA, SM (1915–1994)	1 January 1966	30 November 1967	1 year, 333 days	
8	Willem Louw SSA, SM	Lieutenant General; Willem Louw SSA, SM (1920–1980)	1 December 1967	30 June 1973	5 years, 211 days	
9	Magnus Malan SSA, OMSG, SD, SM	Lieutenant General; Magnus Malan SSA, OMSG, SD, SM (1930–2011)	1 July 1973	31 August 1976	3 years, 61 days	
10	Constand Viljoen SSA, SD, SOE, SM, MMM, ORB	Lieutenant General; Constand Viljoen SSA, SD, SOE, SM, MMM, ORB (1933–2020)	1 September 1976	6 October 1980	4 years, 30 days	—
11	Johannes Geldenhuys SSA, SD, SOE, SM, MMM, GCIH, ORB	Lieutenant General; Johannes Geldenhuys SSA, SD, SOE, SM, MMM, GCIH, ORB (1935–2018)	7 October 1980	30 October 1985	5 years, 23 days	
12	Andreas Liebenberg SSAS, SD, SOE, SM, MMM	Lieutenant General; Andreas Liebenberg SSAS, SD, SOE, SM, MMM (1938–1998)	1 November 1985	28 February 1990	4 years, 119 days	—
13	Georg Meiring SSA, SD, SM, MMM, ORB	Lieutenant General; Georg Meiring SSA, SD, SM, MMM, ORB (1939–2024)	1 March 1990	31 October 1993	3 years, 244 days	—
14	Hattingh Pretorius SD, SM, MMM	Lieutenant General; Hattingh Pretorius SD, SM, MMM (1942–2008)	1 November 1993	31 December 1994	1 year, 60 days	—
15	Reginald Otto SD & Bar, SM, MMM	Lieutenant General; Reginald Otto SD & Bar, SM, MMM (1943–2022)	1 January 1995	30 June 1998	3 years, 180 days	—
16	Gilbert Ramano SSAS, SD, MMS, MMM, MMB	Lieutenant General; Gilbert Ramano SSAS, SD, MMS, MMM, MMB (1939–2025)	1 July 1998	31 May 2004	5 years, 335 days	—
17	Solly Shoke OMBG, SBS, MMS, OMS	Lieutenant General; Solly Shoke OMBG, SBS, MMS, OMS (born 1956)	1 June 2004	1 May 2011	6 years, 334 days	—
18	Vusumuzi Masondo MMM	Lieutenant General; Vusumuzi Masondo MMM (born 1957)	1 October 2011	31 January 2016	4 years, 122 days	
19	Lindile Yam	Lieutenant General; Lindile Yam (born 1960)	1 February 2016	31 October 2019	3 years, 272 days	
20	Thabiso Mokhosi	Lieutenant General; Thabiso Mokhosi (c. 1968–2019)	1 November 2019	10 December 2019 †	39 days	
21	Lawrence Mbatha	Lieutenant General; Lawrence Mbatha (born 1968)	9 April 2020	Incumbent	6 years, 193 days	

Lieutenant General Werndly van der Riet and Major General Mannetjies de Goede spent some time acting as Chief of the Army.

== Chief of the Air Force ==
The Chief of the South African Air Force is the professional head of the Air Force. The post was called 'Director of Air Services' 1920–37, 'Director of Air & Technical Services' 1937–39, 'Director-General of Air Services' 1939–41, 'Director-General of the Air Force' 1941–51, and 'Air Chief of Staff' 1951–66, and has been 'Chief of the Air Force' since 1966.

No.	Portrait	Chief of the Air Force	Took office	Left office	Time in office	Ref.
1	Sir Pierre van Ryneveld KBE, CB, DSO, MC	Colonel; Sir Pierre van Ryneveld KBE, CB, DSO, MC (1891–1972)	1 February 1920	30 September 1937	17 years, 241 days	
2	Francis Hoare CB, CBE	Colonel; Francis Hoare CB, CBE (1879–1959)	1 October 1937	31 October 1937	30 days	—
3	Hector Daniel CBE, MC, AFC	Lieutenant Colonel; Hector Daniel CBE, MC, AFC (1898–1953)	1 November 1937	12 September 1939	2 years, 41 days	—
4	John Holthouse OBE	Colonel; John Holthouse OBE (1891–1964)	13 September 1939	30 September 1940	1 year, 17 days	—
5	Christoffel Venter CB, DFC & bar	Major General; Christoffel Venter CB, DFC & bar (1892–1977)	1 October 1940	16 October 1945	5 years, 15 days	—
6	Harold Willmott CBE	Brigadier; Harold Willmott CBE (1899–1993)	17 October 1945	10 September 1946	328 days	—
7	James 'Jimmy' Durrant CB, DFC	Brigadier; James 'Jimmy' Durrant CB, DFC (1913–1990)	1 October 1946	30 June 1951	4 years, 272 days	—
(6)	Harold Willmott CBE	Brigadier; Harold Willmott CBE (1899–1993)	1 July 1951	24 August 1954	3 years, 54 days	—
8	Stephen Melville SSA, OBE	Brigadier; Stephen Melville SSA, OBE (1904–1977)	25 August 1954	22 September 1956	2 years, 28 days	—
9	Barend Viljoen SSA, OBE	Major General; Barend Viljoen SSA, OBE (1908–1995)	23 September 1956	30 April 1965	8 years, 219 days	—
10	Henry 'Kalfie' Martin SM, CBE, DFC	Lieutenant General; Henry 'Kalfie' Martin SM, CBE, DFC (1910–2000)	1 May 1965	30 November 1967	2 years, 213 days	—
11	Jacobus Verster SSA, SM	Lieutenant General; Jacobus Verster SSA, SM (1919–1981)	1 December 1967	28 February 1975	7 years, 89 days	—
12	Robert 'Bob' Rogers SSA, SM, MMM, DSO, DFC & bar	Lieutenant General; Robert 'Bob' Rogers SSA, SM, MMM, DSO, DFC & bar (1921–2000)	1 March 1975	30 November 1979	4 years, 274 days	—
13	Michal Muller SSAS, SD	Lieutenant General; Michal Muller SSAS, SD (born 1930)	1 December 1979	29 February 1984	4 years, 90 days	—
14	Denis Earp SSA, SD, SM, SOE	Lieutenant General; Denis Earp SSA, SD, SM, SOE (1930–2019)	1 March 1984	30 June 1988	4 years, 121 days	—
15	Jan van Loggerenberg SSAS, SD, SOE, SM, MMM, ORB	Lieutenant General; Jan van Loggerenberg SSAS, SD, SOE, SM, MMM, ORB (1935–2022)	1 July 1988	31 October 1991	3 years, 122 days	—
16	James Kriel SSAS, SD, SM, MMM	Lieutenant General; James Kriel SSAS, SD, SM, MMM (1942–2016)	1 November 1991	30 April 1996	4 years, 181 days	—
17	Willem Hechter SSA, SD, SM, MMM	Lieutenant General; Willem Hechter SSA, SD, SM, MMM (born 1942)	1 May 1996	29 February 2000	3 years, 304 days	
18	Roelf Beukes SD, SM, MMM	Lieutenant General; Roelf Beukes SD, SM, MMM	1 March 2000	28 February 2005	4 years, 364 days	—
19	Carlo Gagiano SM, MMM	Lieutenant General; Carlo Gagiano SM, MMM (born 1951)	1 March 2005	30 September 2012	7 years, 213 days	—
20	Fabian Msimang SM, MMM	Lieutenant General; Fabian Msimang SM, MMM (born 1960)	1 October 2012	30 September 2020	7 years, 365 days	
–	Mzayifani Buthelezi	Lieutenant General; Mzayifani Buthelezi (born 1965); Acting	30 September 2020	1 June 2021	244 days	
21	Wiseman Mbambo	Lieutenant General; Wiseman Mbambo (born 1966)	1 June 2021	31 March 2026	4 years, 303 days	
22	Carl Moatshe	Lieutenant General; Carl Moatshe	1 April 2026	Incumbent	201 days	

== Chief of the Navy ==
The Chief of the South African Navy is the professional head of the Navy. The post was called 'Officer Commanding South African Naval Service' 1922–32, 'Director, Seaward Defence Force' 1940–42, 'Director, South African Naval Forces' 1942–51, 'Naval & Marine Chief of Staff' 1951–55, and 'Naval Chief of Staff' 1955–66, and has been 'Chief of the Navy' since 1966.

No.	Portrait	Chief of the Navy	Took office	Left office	Time in office	Ref.
1	Norman Rankin	Commander; Norman Rankin	1 April 1922	3 June 1928	6 years, 63 days	—
2	Robert F.U.P. Fitzgerald	Commander; Robert F.U.P. Fitzgerald	4 June 1928	4 November 1932	4 years, 153 days	—
Position of the Chief of the Navy did not exist from 1932 to 1939 (Note: During this period, the Navy disposed of its ships and reduced personnel to a few administrative staff due to the Great Depression.)
3	Guy Hallifax CMG	Rear Admiral; Guy Hallifax CMG (1884–1941)	16 September 1939	28 March 1941 †	1 year, 193 days	—
4	James Dalgleish CBE	Commodore; James Dalgleish CBE (1891–1964)	28 March 1941	30 November 1946	5 years, 247 days	—
5	Frederick Dean OBE	Commodore; Frederick Dean OBE (1900–1983)	1 December 1946	30 June 1951	4 years, 211 days	—
6	Pieter de Waal CB, CBE	Brigadier; Pieter de Waal CB, CBE (1899–1977)	1 July 1951	30 November 1952	1 year, 152 days	—
7	Hugo Biermann SSA, SD, OBE, GCIH	Vice Admiral; Hugo Biermann SSA, SD, OBE, GCIH (1916–2012)	1 December 1952	31 March 1972	19 years, 121 days	—
8	James 'Flam' Johnson SSA, SM, DSC	Vice Admiral; James 'Flam' Johnson SSA, SM, DSC (1918–1990)	1 April 1972	30 September 1977	5 years, 182 days	—
9	Johan Charl Walters SD, SM, MMM	Vice Admiral; Johan Charl Walters SD, SM, MMM (1919–1993)	1 October 1977	30 January 1980	2 years, 121 days	—
10	Ronald A. Edwards SSAS, SM, MMM	Vice Admiral; Ronald A. Edwards SSAS, SM, MMM (1923–2014)	1 February 1980	30 September 1982	2 years, 241 days	—
11	Andries P 'Dries' Putter SSAS, SD, MMM	Vice Admiral; Andries P 'Dries' Putter SSAS, SD, MMM (1935–2014)	1 October 1982	30 June 1985	2 years, 272 days	—
12	Glen Syndercombe SSA, SD, SOE, SM, MMM	Vice Admiral; Glen Syndercombe SSA, SD, SOE, SM, MMM (1931–2005)	1 July 1985	31 March 1989	3 years, 273 days	—
(11)	Andries P 'Dries' Putter SSAS, SD, MMM	Vice Admiral; Andries P 'Dries' Putter SSAS, SD, MMM (1935–2014)	1 April 1989	30 June 1990	1 year, 90 days	—
13	Lambert J 'Woody' Woodburne DVR, SD, SM	Vice Admiral; Lambert J 'Woody' Woodburne DVR, SD, SM (1939–2013)	1 July 1990	31 August 1992	2 years, 61 days	—
14	Robert Simpson-Anderson SSAS, SD, SM, MMM	Vice Admiral; Robert Simpson-Anderson SSAS, SD, SM, MMM (born 1942)	1 September 1992	31 October 2000	8 years, 60 days	—
15	Johan Retief SD & Bar, PG, SM, MMM	Vice Admiral; Johan Retief SD & Bar, PG, SM, MMM (born 1946)	1 November 2000	28 February 2005	4 years, 119 days	—
16	Refiloe Johannes Mudimu CLS, DMG, SM, MMS, MMM, MMB	Vice Admiral; Refiloe Johannes Mudimu CLS, DMG, SM, MMS, MMM, MMB (born 1954)	1 March 2005	31 March 2014	9 years, 30 days	
17	Samuel Hlongwane MMS, MMB	Vice Admiral; Samuel Hlongwane MMS, MMB (born 1962)	1 April 2014	30 June 2022	8 years, 90 days	
18	Monde Lobese MMS, MMB	Vice Admiral; Monde Lobese MMS, MMB	1 November 2022	Incumbent	3 years, 352 days	

== Surgeon General ==
The Surgeon General is the Chief of the South African Military Health Service (SAMHS), which was known as the South African Medical Service (SAMS) before 1994.

No.	Portrait	Surgeon General	Took office	Left office	Time in office	Ref.
South African Medical Service
1	Eugene Raymond SSA, SM	Major General; Eugene Raymond SSA, SM (born 1923)	1 February 1960	31 March 1969	9 years, 58 days	—
2	Colin Cockcroft SSA, SM, SSA, SD, SM, MMM	Lieutenant General; Colin Cockcroft SSA, SM, SSA, SD, SM, MMM (1917–1987)	1 April 1969	31 October 1977	8 years, 213 days	—
3	Nicolaas Nieuwoudt SSA, SD, SM	Lieutenant General; Nicolaas Nieuwoudt SSA, SD, SM (1929–1989)	1 November 1977	29 February 1988	10 years, 120 days	—
4	Daniel Knobel SD, SOE, SM, MMM, KStJ, MBC, HB, PHD	Lieutenant General; Daniel Knobel SD, SOE, SM, MMM, KStJ, MBC, HB, PHD (1936–2021)	1 March 1988	27 April 1994	6 years, 57 days	—
South African Military Health Service
1	Daniel Knobel SD, SOE, SM, MMM, KStJ, MBC, HB, PHD	Lieutenant General; Daniel Knobel SD, SOE, SM, MMM, KStJ, MBC, HB, PHD (1936–2021)	27 April 1994	30 November 1997	3 years, 217 days	—
2	Davidson Masuku SSAS, MMM, KStJ	Lieutenant General; Davidson Masuku SSAS, MMM, KStJ (1940–2000)	1 December 1997	30 September 2000	2 years, 334 days	
3	Jurinus Janse van Rensburg SD, SM, MMM, KStJ	Lieutenant General; Jurinus Janse van Rensburg SD, SM, MMM, KStJ (born 1952)	1 October 2000	31 July 2005	4 years, 303 days	—
4	Vejaynand Ramlakan DMG, MMS, MMB, KStJ	Lieutenant General; Vejaynand Ramlakan DMG, MMS, MMB, KStJ (1957–2020)	1 August 2005	31 March 2013	7 years, 242 days	—
5	Aubrey Sedibe DMG, MMS, MMB, OStJ, MBC, HB, PHD	Lieutenant General; Aubrey Sedibe DMG, MMS, MMB, OStJ, MBC, HB, PHD (born 1957)	1 April 2013	31 October 2019	6 years, 213 days	—
6	Zola Dabula	Lieutenant General; Zola Dabula (born 1956)	1 November 2019	31 October 2021	1 year, 364 days	
7	Ntshavheni Maphaha	Lieutenant General; Ntshavheni Maphaha (born 1966)	1 November 2021	Incumbent	4 years, 303 days	
8	Robert Skosana	Lieutenant General; Robert Skosana	1 September 2026	Incumbent	48 days	

== Chief of Joint Operations ==
No.	Portrait	Chief of Joint Operations	Took office	Left office	Time in office	Defence branch	Ref.
1	Deon Ferreira PVD, SD, SM, MMM	Lieutenant General; Deon Ferreira PVD, SD, SM, MMM (1946–2002)	1 August 1997	31 December 2000	3 years, 152 days	South African Army	—
2	Godfrey Ngwenya SBG, DMG, MMS, LOM (USA)	Lieutenant General; Godfrey Ngwenya SBG, DMG, MMS, LOM (USA) (born 1950)	1 January 2001	31 May 2005	4 years, 150 days	South African Army	—
3	Sipho Binda MMS	Lieutenant General; Sipho Binda MMS (1952–2006)	1 June 2005	10 November 2006 †	1 year, 162 days	South African Army	
4	Themba Matanzima CCM, SM, MMM	Lieutenant General; Themba Matanzima CCM, SM, MMM (born 1953)	1 September 2007	30 September 2011	4 years, 29 days	South African Army	—
5	Derrick Mgwebi	Lieutenant General; Derrick Mgwebi (born 1956)	1 October 2011	31 January 2016	4 years, 122 days	South African Army	
6	Duma Mdutyana MMB	Lieutenant General; Duma Mdutyana MMB (1960–2016)	1 February 2016	6 July 2016 †	156 days	South African Army	
7	Barney Hlatswayo	Lieutenant General; Barney Hlatswayo (born 1958)	1 January 2017	31 October 2019	2 years, 303 days	South African Army	—
8	Rudzani Maphwanya	Lieutenant General; Rudzani Maphwanya (born 1960)	1 November 2019	30 May 2021	1 year, 210 days	South African Army	
9	Siphiwe Sangweni	Lieutenant General; Siphiwe Sangweni	1 June 2021	Incumbent	5 years, 140 days	South African Army	

== Chief of Corporate Staff ==
The Chief of Corporate Staff is responsible for the provision of all staff services for the SANDF.

No.	Portrait	Chief of Corporate Staff	Took office	Left office	Time in office	Defence branch	Ref.
1	Martyn Trainor SD, SM, MMM	Vice Admiral; Martyn Trainor SD, SM, MMM (born 1944)	1 October 2000	31 January 2004	3 years, 122 days	South African Navy	—
2	Themba Matanzima CCM, SM, MMM	Lieutenant General; Themba Matanzima CCM, SM, MMM (born 1953)	1 February 2004	31 July 2005	1 year, 180 days	South African Army	—
3	Jurinus Janse van Rensburg SD, SM, MMM, KStJ	Lieutenant General; Jurinus Janse van Rensburg SD, SM, MMM, KStJ (born 1952)	1 August 2005	30 April 2010	4 years, 272 days	South African Military Health Service	—
—	Louis Dlulane	Major General; Louis Dlulane (born 1952); Acting	1 May 2010	30 March 2013	2 years, 333 days	South African Army	
4	Vejaynand Ramlakan DMG, MMS, MMB, KStJ	Lieutenant General; Vejaynand Ramlakan DMG, MMS, MMB, KStJ (born 1957)	1 April 2013	31 May 2015	2 years, 60 days	South African Military Health Service	
5	Vusumuzi Masondo MMM	Lieutenant General; Vusumuzi Masondo MMM (born 1957)	1 February 2016	31 October 2019	3 years, 272 days	South African Army	
6	Lindile Yam	Lieutenant General; Lindile Yam (born 1960)	1 November 2019	31 October 2022	2 years, 364 days	South African Army	
7	Michael Ramantswana	Lieutenant General; Michael Ramantswana	1 November 2022	30 July 2026	3 years, 272 days	South African Army	
8	Tandekile Xundu	Lieutenant General; Tandekile Xundu	1 August 2026	Incumbent	79 days	South African Army	

== Sgts Major ==
Sergeants Major of the Defence Force
From	Union Defence Force (UDF) (prior to 1957)	To
1947	WO1 James Samuel Hulme (Note: WO1 James Samuel Hulme was the first Sergeant Major of the Union Defence Force (UDF), serving from 1947 to 1950. Prior to his appointment as Sergeant Major, he had served in the British Army during World War II, where he was awarded the Military Medal for his bravery in action. He later served in the South African Army until his retirement in 1950. As the first Sergeant Major of the UDF, Hulme played an important role in establishing the position and the responsibilities that would come with it. He was responsible for the discipline, training, and morale of the soldiers under his command, and worked closely with officers to ensure that their commands were carried out effectively. He also acted as a liaison between the enlisted soldiers and the officers, and helped to address any concerns or issues that arose.)	1950
1950	WO1 David Goldblatt (Note: WO1 David Goldblatt was the second Sergeant Major of the Union Defence Force, serving from 1950 to 1953. Prior to his appointment as Sergeant Major, he had served in the South African Army, including service in North Africa during World War II. As Sergeant Major, Goldblatt was responsible for maintaining the discipline and morale of the troops under his command, as well as ensuring that they were properly trained and equipped. He also played a role in the development of the South African Army's non-commissioned officer corps, and was instrumental in the creation of the rank of Warrant Officer Class 1, which became the highest rank attainable by non-commissioned officers in the South African military. After his retirement from the military, Goldblatt became involved in various veterans' organizations, and continued to work to improve the status and recognition of non-commissioned officers in the South African military.)	1953
1953	WO1 John Pelham Mundy (Note: WO1 John Pelham Mundy was a highly decorated soldier in the South African military who served as the third Sergeant Major of the Union Defence Force from 1953 to 1956. Mundy joined the South African Army in 1940 and served in North Africa during World War II. He was awarded several decorations for his bravery in combat, including the Military Medal, the Africa Star, and the War Medal. As Sergeant Major, Mundy played an important role in the development of the South African Army's non-commissioned officer corps. He was also known for his dedication to the welfare of the troops under his command, and was often called upon to mediate disputes and resolve conflicts between soldiers. After his retirement from the military in 1956, Mundy continued to work to improve the status and recognition of non-commissioned officers in the South African military. He also served as a mentor to many young soldiers, and was widely respected for his leadership and integrity.)	1956
1956	WO1 Thomas Benjamin Brown (Note: WO1 Thomas Benjamin Brown was a highly decorated soldier in the South African military who served as the Sergeant Major of the Union Defence Force from 1947 to 1953. Brown joined the South African Army in 1939 and served in North Africa during World War II. He was awarded several decorations for his bravery in combat, including the Military Medal, the Africa Star, and the War Medal. As Sergeant Major, Brown was responsible for the training and discipline of non-commissioned officers in the South African Army. He was also involved in the development of the South African Army's non-commissioned officer corps and played a key role in creating a professional and disciplined military force. After his retirement from the military, Brown remained active in veterans' organizations and continued to advocate for the recognition and welfare of non-commissioned officers in the South African military. He was widely respected for his leadership and commitment to service.)	1957
From	SADF (prior to 1994)	To
1961	WO1 J. A. van der Merwe	1964
1964	WO1 F. P. Marais	1966
1966	WO1 W. J. van Rensburg	1969
1969	WO1 W. R. Myburgh	1972
1972	WO1 J. C. Smit	1976
1976	WO1 J. A. Schoeman	1980
1980	WO1 J. J. Grobbelaar	1983
1983	WO1 C. J. Badenhorst	1987
1987	WO1 P. J. van der Merwe	1990
1990	WO1 W. E. W. Fourie	1991
1991	WO1 G. Moorcroft	1993
1993	WO1 J. L. Calitz	1994
From	SANDF (post 1994)	To
1994	WO1 J. L. Calitz	1998
1998	WO1 J. J. van Zyl	2003
2003	WO1 L. J. Green	2006
2006	WO1 M. J. Nortjé	2009
2009	WO1 P. J. Appelgryn	2010
2010	WO1 D. E. Motau	2013
2013	WO1 P. R. Masondo	2015
2015	A. G. Mashaba	2018
2018	WO1 L. M. Masemola	2021
2021	WO1 N. Maphaha	now
