= Mzayifani Buthelezi =

South African Air Force officer

Mzayifani Innocent Buthelezi
- Born: 20 May 1965 (age 61); Durban
- Military career
- Allegiance: South Africa
- Branch: South African Air Force
- Rank: Major General
- Commands: Deputy Chief of the Air Force; Acting Chief of the Air Force; Director Air Transport and Maritime Systems

Mzayifani Buthelezi is a South African Air Force officer serving as Acting Chief of the Air Force.

He was appointed Deputy Chief of the Air Force from 1 June 2017.

Military offices
Preceded by Fabian Msimang	Chief of the South African Air Force (acting); 2020–2021	Succeeded by Wiseman Mbambo
