= Chief of Defence Force Staff (South Africa) =

- Country: South Africa
- Allegiance: South Africa South Africa

The Chief of Defence Force Staff (C Def F S) was a post in the South African Defence Force and the South African National Defence Force.

== History ==
The Chief of Defence Force Staff was a lieutenant general post in the South African Defence Force which traces its origins from the sixties. In the middle sixties, the expansion of the Defence Force necessitated some changes to the overall structure and at that time, the posts of GOC Joint Combat Forces (GOC JCF), Chief of Defence Staff, Chief of Defence Force Administration to name a few were established. In 1976 this post ceased to exist and was re-established in 1986 during Gen Johannes Geldenhuys' term as C SADF. Its role was to coordinate all efforts of Chief of Staff Personnel, Chief of Staff Intelligence, Chief of Staff Operations, Chief of Staff Logistics, Chief of Staff Finances and Chief of Staff Planning for the Chief of the Defence Force.

== Past appointments ==
=== Chief of Defence Staff ===
- Maj Gen Toby Moll SM DSO
- Lt Gen Kalfie Martin SM CBE DFC
- Lt Gen Booysie van der Riet SSA SM MC
- Lt Gen Raymond Armstrong SSA SM

=== Chief of Defence Force Staff ===
- Lt Gen Ian Gleeson SSA SD SM
- Lt Gen Kat Liebenberg SSAS SD SM
- V Adm Bert Bekker SSA SD SM MMM
- Lt Gen Pierre Steyn SD SM MMM
- Lt Gen Siphiwe Nyanda MMM

== Staff Divisions ==
The staff divisions were numbered as follows:

1. Personnel 1
2. Intelligence 2
3. Operations 3
4. Logistics 4
5. Finances 5
6. Planning 6

Note: All these divisions had a three star rank as a chief of staff.

== See also ==
- Chief of Corporate Staff
