= Rudolph Hiemstra =

South African military commander (1912-2007)

General Rudolph Christiaan Hiemstra SSA SM
- Born: 10 March 1912; Lydenburg, South Africa
- Died: 26 July 2007 (aged 95); Pretoria, South Africa
- Spouse: Gertruida Hiemstra (wife)
- Relatives: Judge Victor Hiemstra (brother)
- Military career
- Allegiance: South Africa
- Branch: South African Air Force
- Service years: 1931–1972
- Rank: General
- Nickname: Rudi
- Service number: 01217207PE
- Commands: Commandant General of the South African Defence Force; 2 Squadron SAAF
- Awards

General Rudolph Christiaan Hiemstra SSA SM (10 March 1912 – 26 July 2007) was a South African Air Force commander who served as Commandant General of the South African Defence Force.

== Military career ==
Hiemstra joined the South African Air Force in 1931. He did not serve in the Second World War because of his political opposition to South Africa's involvement in the war and sympathy for Nazi Germany, and was transferred to the civil service, from which he returned to the defence force when the National Party government came to power in 1948.

Hiemstra was Military Attaché in Sweden, France and the United Kingdom. Among other appointments, he was officer commanding 2 Squadron SAAF, The Flying Cheetahs.

Hiemstra served as Adjutant General, interrupted by his attendance at the Imperial Defence College, as Inspector General from 1959 to 1960, as Deputy Commandant General from 1961 to 1965, and as Commandant General of the South African Defence Force from 1965 to 1972. In 1966, the Commandant General was appointed Secretary for Defence over and above his appointment as head of the South African Defence Force.

In May 1967, the dual title of Commandant General and Secretary for Defence was dispensed with by the elimination of the title "Secretary for Defence". The Commandant General, as permanent head of the Department of Defence as well as of the South African Defence Force filled the post of Commandant General, which post embraced the functions signified by the former dual title. At the same time the rank of Commandant General, instituted in September 1956, was changed to that of general.

== Awards and decorations ==
In 1960, Hiemstra was awarded the Star of South Africa for exceptional services. He was also awarded the Southern Cross Medal and appointed a Knight of the Order of Prince Henry from Portugal.

- Star of South Africa (1952) (SSA)
- Southern Cross Medal (1952) (SM)
- Queen Elizabeth II Coronation Medal
- Union Medal
- Order of Prince Henry (Knight) (CvIH) (Note: Portuguese: Cavaleiro)

== Death ==
Hiemstra died on 26 July 2007, aged 95, in 1 Military Hospital in Pretoria. He was survived by six children, sixteen grandchildren and four great grandchildren.

Among his influential brothers were Dr Louis W. Hiemstra, who made his in mark in the field of journalism, and Judge Victor Hiemstra of Pretoria.

== Notes ==
Military offices
| Preceded by Cmdt Gen Pieter Grobbelaar | Commandant General of the South African Defence Force; 1965–1972 | Succeeded by Adm Hugo Biermann |
| Preceded by Maj Gen Stephen Melville | Inspector General South African Defence Force; 1959–1960 | Post disbanded |
| Preceded by Brig Steve Joubert | Adjutant General South African Defence Force; 1953–1959 | Succeeded by Brig Christiaan Hartzenberg |
