= Pierre Steyn =

Lieutenant General Pierre Steyn SD SM MMM
- Born: 25 November 1942 (age 83); Bothaville, Orange Free State
- Alma mater: Stellenbosch University; University of South Africa
- Spouse: Fiona Gerda Steyn
- Military career
- Allegiance: South Africa
- Branch: South African Air Force
- Service years: 1960–1993 (34 years)
- Rank: Lieutenant General
- Commands: Chief of Defence Force Staff; OC Air Force Base Hoedspruit
- Awards: Southern Cross Decoration SD Southern Cross Medal SM Military Merit Medal MMM Pro Patria Medal Southern Africa Medal General Service Medal (South Africa) Good Service Medal
- Other work: Secretary of Defence

Lieutenant-General Pierre Derksen Steyn SD SM MMM (born 25 November 1942) is a retired South African Air Force officer who served as Secretary for Defence from 1994 to 1998, and as Chief of Defence Force Staff from 1990 to 1993. He is also known as the chair of the Steyn Commission, which from 1992 to 1993 investigated allegations of criminal and third force activity by the apartheid-era South African Defence Force.

== Biography ==
Steyn joined the South African Air Force (SAAF) of the South African Defence Force (SADF) in 1960, and in 1963 graduated from the military academy at Stellenbosch University with a BMil. He also has an MBL from Unisa (1990) and an LLB from Unisa (2011). He served as SAAF Chief of Operations from 1987 to 1988, as SADF Chief of Staff Personnel from 1989 to 1990, and as Chief of Defence Force Staff from 1990 to 1993. In 1992, President F. W. de Klerk appointed him to chair a commission of inquiry, best known as the Steyn Commission, into possible criminal activity among SADF units. He retired from the military in October 1993, several months after the submission of the Commission's final report.

=== Arms Deal ===
In August 1994, Steyn was appointed the inaugural Secretary for Defence, a new civilian position at the head of the Department of Defence. He resigned in August 1998. He has said that he resigned because of financial management and procurement irregularities relating to the Arms Deal, which was signed in 1999 after his departure. He testified about the deal at the Arms Procurement Commission in May 2014, and was highly critical of the conduct of former Defence Minister Joe Modise and former SADF Chief of Acquisition Shamin "Chippy" Shaik.

== Steyn Commission ==
Commission on Alleged Dangerous Activities of SADF Components
- Interim report (1992)
- Date: November 1992 – July 1993
- Also known as: Steyn Commission
- Commissioner: Pierre Steyn

Amid the precarious negotiations to end apartheid, the early 1990s in South Africa were marked by political violence, commonly alleged by the African National Congress to be attributable to a state-aligned "third force." In this context, the Goldstone Commission, in the course of its inquiry into political violence, conducted a raid on the SADF Directorate of Covert Collections. When it found evidence of possible SADF involvement in illegal activities, Steyn was appointed, on 18 November 1992, to investigate. Steyn has said that he was constantly surveilled and harassed during the period in which the Commission operated.

=== The Night of the Generals ===
In December 1992, in what is sometimes known as "the Night of the Generals," de Klerk met with Steyn and, the next day, announced that 23 SADF members had been compelled to retire or suspended pending further investigation. In Steyn's account, he had presented a situation report on his investigation to de Klerk, but had not recommended any specific actions or dismissals; instead, de Klerk had decided on the dismissals following consultation with SADF leadership.

=== Further reports and aftermath ===
Steyn submitted several further reports to de Klerk before the Commission closed in July 1993. Some of the matters raised by Steyn were referred back to the Goldstone Commission or were taken up by the Truth and Reconciliation Commission.

A criminal investigation was conducted into implicated SADF officers, at Steyn's recommendation. According to SADF Chief Georg Meiring, the investigation was initiated in January 1993 under the Attorneys-General of the Transvaal and Witswatersrand, but was unable to substantiate Steyn's allegations. Ultimately, Wouter Basson, one of the generals suspended in December 1992, was the only SADF official to face criminal charges for activities investigated by the Steyn Commission. Indeed, Steyn had noted in his first report that his suspicions would be difficult to prove conclusively, especially due to the destruction of records and other evidence by SADF officials.

=== Findings ===
The report of the Commission was partly leaked in 1997, but only declassified in 2006. According to the Mail and Guardian, President Nelson Mandela had decided that its findings were so "explosive" that their publication might threaten the stability of the post-apartheid transition. The report shows that the Commission found prima facie, but primarily under-corroborated, indication that SADF members had been involved in:

- Extra-judicial killings, including by poison
- Chemical attacks
- Weapons stockpiling in Portugal, elsewhere in Africa, and domestically
- Corruption
- Train violence and hostel violence
- Provision of military training to insurgents in neighbouring countries and to Inkatha
- Third force activity through "Project Pastoor"

Among the SADF units implicated in such activities were the 7 Medical Battalion; Special Forces; and Military Intelligence and its Directorate of Covert Collection. Some projects were allegedly undertaken in collaboration with the police or Civil Cooperation Bureau.

== Awards and decorations ==
- Southern Cross Decoration (SD)
- Southern Cross Medal (1975) (SM)
- Military Merit Medal (MMM)
- Pro Patria Medal
- Southern Africa Medal
- General Service Medal (South Africa)
- Good Service Medal (Gold (30 Years))
- Good Service Medal (Silver (20 Years))
- Good Service Medal (Bronze (10 Years))
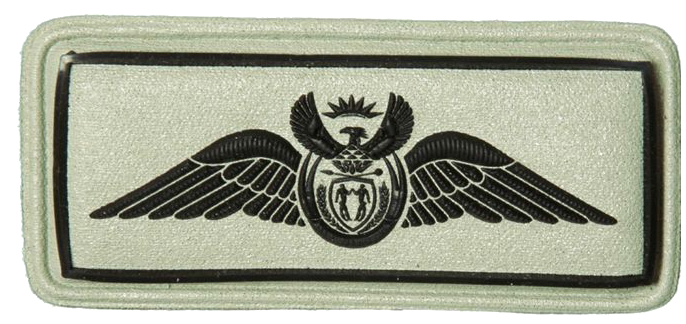
- SAAF Pilot's Wings (more than 2500 hours)

Military offices
New title Post re-created	Secretary for Defence; 1994–1999	Succeeded by January Masilela
Preceded by Bert Bekker	Chief of Defence Force Staff; 1992–1993	Vacant Title next held by Siphiwe Nyanda in 1994
Preceded by Len Meyer	Chief of Staff Personnel; 1991–1992	Succeeded by Willie Wolmarans
Preceded by James Kriel	Deputy Chief of Staff Operations; 1990–1991	Succeeded by Joep Joubert
Preceded by James Kriel	Chief of Air Staff Operations; 1987–1990	Succeeded by James Kriel
Preceded by Pieter Bosman Huyser	Inspector General South African Air Force; 1986–1987	Succeeded by PJ Geldinhuys
Preceded by PF Gouws	OC AFB Hoedspruit; 1982–1984	Succeeded by Chris Lombard
