= Siphiwe Nyanda =

South African Army general and Cabinet Minister

General Siphiwe Nyanda SSA SBS CLS DMG MMS MMM
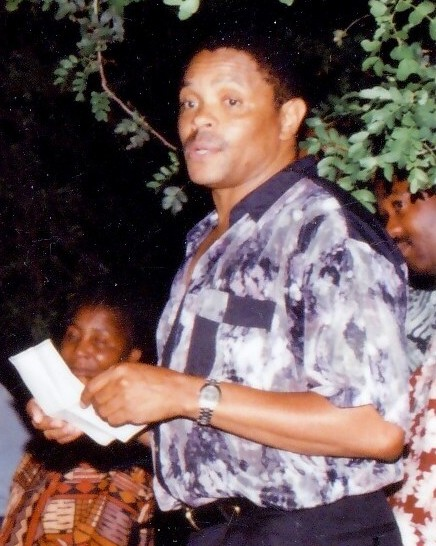
- Nyanda as a Major General in 1996
- In office 2009–2010
- Preceded by: Ivy Matsepe-Casaburri
- Succeeded by: Roy Padayachie

SA Ambassador to Mozambique
- Incumbent
- Assumed office 2020–present

Chief of the South African National Defence Force
- In office 1 June 1998 – 31 May 2005
- Preceded by: Georg Meiring
- Succeeded by: Godfrey Ngwenya

Deputy Commander and Chief of Staff of MK
- In office 1992–1994
- Preceded by: Chris Hani
- Succeeded by: position dissolved

Personal details
- Born: 22 May 1950 (age 76) Johannesburg, South Africa
- Spouse: Polygamous
- Civilian awards: Star of South Africa SSAG

Military service
- Allegiance: South Africa
- Branch/service: South African Army; uMkhonto we Sizwe
- Years of service: 1974–2005
- Rank: General
- Unit: SA Army College
- Commands: Chief of the South African National Defence Force; Gauteng Command Chief of Staff of the uMkhonto we Sizwe
- Battles/wars: Matola Raid
- Military awards: Star for Bravery SBS Conspicuous Leadership Star CLS Decoration for Merit DMG Merit Medal MMS Military Merit Medal MMM Operational Medal for Southern Africa South Africa Service Medal Unitas (Unity) Medal Medalje vir Troue Diens (Medal for Loyal Service) Service Medal Legion of Merit LOM Order of Military Merit CISM Order of Merit Santos-Dumont Merit Medal Peacemaker Medal Legion of Honour

General Siphiwe Nyanda SSA SBS CLS DMG MMS MMM (born 1950) is a former South African military commander and politician. He was a member of uMkhonto we Sizwe and served as Chief of the South African National Defence Force from 1998 to 2005, Minister of Communications from 2009 to 2010 and was appointment as a board member of Denel in May 2018.

== Military career ==
Nyanda joined Umkhonto we Sizwe (MK), the military wing of the African National Congress, in 1974, and served as a guerilla commander during the liberation struggle against the South African government in the 1980s. He was appointed MK Chief of Staff in 1992, and served on the Transitional Executive Council which oversaw the change of government in 1994.

Lieutenant General Nyanda became part of the South African National Defence Force, into which MK was incorporated in 1994, and served successively as Chief of Defence Force Staff (1994–1996), General Officer Commanding Gauteng Command (1996–1997), He completed the Senior Command and Staff Duties Course in 1996. Deputy Chief of the South African National Defence Force (1997–1998), and Chief of the South African National Defence Force (1998–2005).

== Awards and decorations ==
In 1999, Nyanda was awarded the Star of South Africa, Gold.

=== Civilian ===
- Star of South Africa (Gold) (SSAG)

=== Military ===
- Star for Bravery (Silver) (SBS)
- Conspicuous Leadership Star (CLS)
- Decoration for Merit (Gold) (DMG)
- Merit Medal (Silver) (MMS)
- Military Merit Medal (MMM)
- Operational Medal for Southern Africa
- South Africa Service Medal
- Unitas (Unity) Medal
- Medalje vir Troue Diens (Medal for Loyal Service) (30 Year Clasp)
- Service Medal (Silver)
- Service Medal (Bronze)

=== Foreign ===
- Legion of Merit (Commander) (LOM) (USA)
- Legion of Honour (Commander) (Note: French: Légion d'honneur - Commandeur) (France)
- Order of Military Merit (Commander - Comendador) (Brazil)
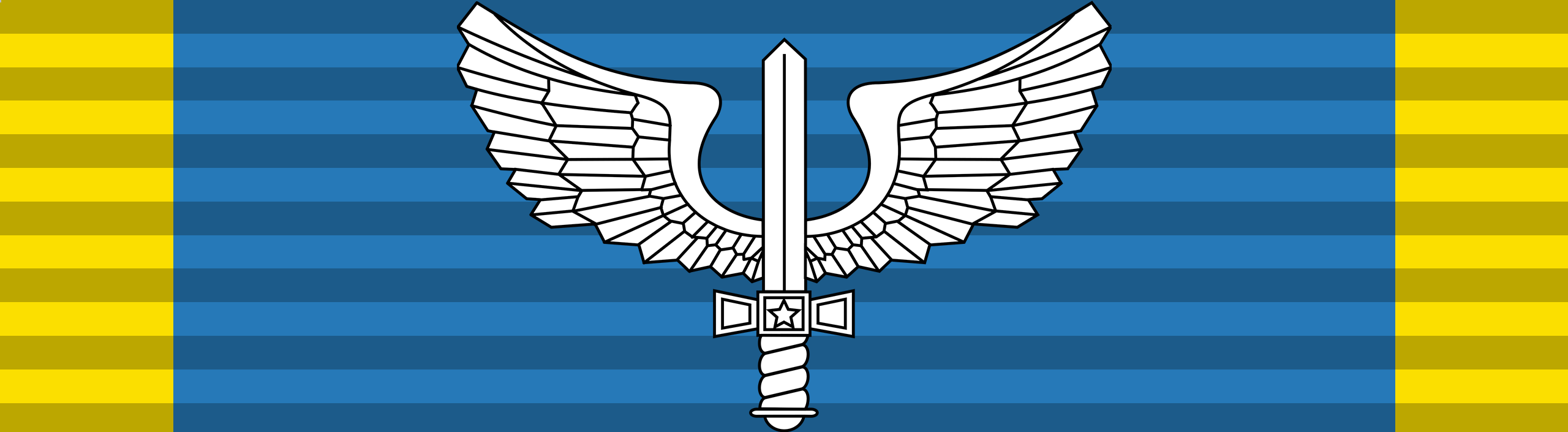
- Santos-Dumont Merit Medal (Brazil)
- Peacemaker Medal (Note: Portuguese: Medalha do Pacificador) (Brazil)
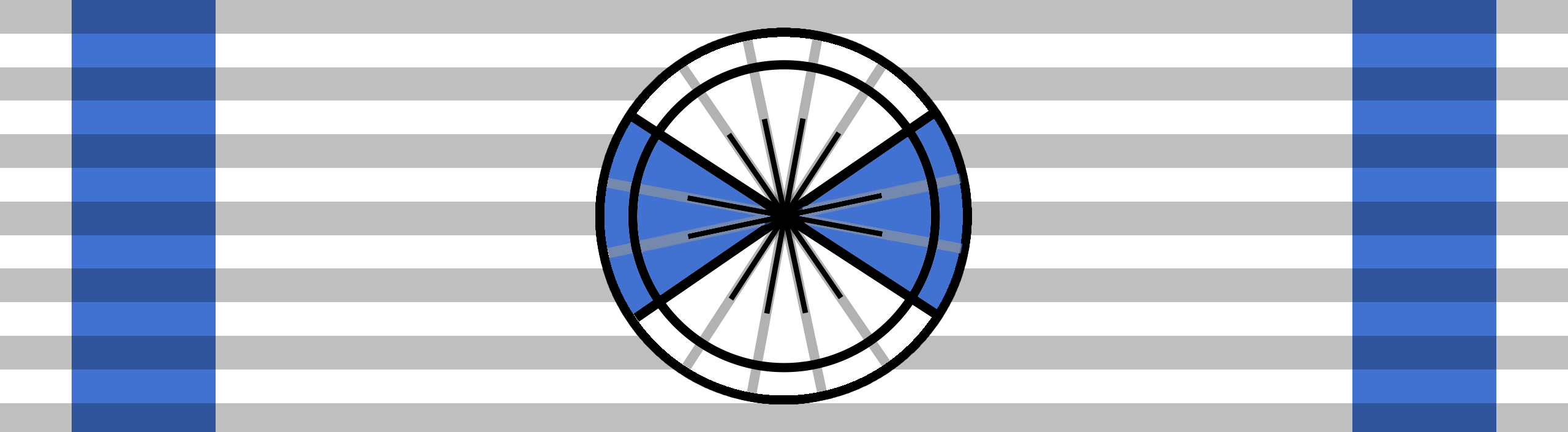
- CISM Order of Merit (Officer)

== Performance as Communications Minister ==
Nyanda was a controversial figure throughout the 18 months that he was minister of communications. Dubbed the "minister of comfort" by South Africa's Mail & Guardian, he was residing in a Cape Town hotel throughout his tenure because he was unhappy with the ministerial house allocated to him.

A company, in which Nyanda's family owned 45%, called GNS Risk Management Services (subsequently renamed Abalozi Security Risk Advisory Services) was accused of impropriety in a tender process in March 2010 due to rogue lawyers. Amongst its numerous clients were several companies, including Transnet CC, passenger train company Metrorail, state bus company Autopax, and the Gauteng Provincial Government.

It later emerged that Transnet Freight Rail had been involved in the awarding of tenders without following the correct procedures. Amongst the tenders that were questioned was one security contract valued at ZAR 55 million, awarded to GNS Risk Management Services. Transnet's CEO, Siyabonga Gama, was dismissed when the allegations came to light. However, Nyanda was not reprimanded.

In October 2010, Nyanda came under fire for the suspension of communications director general Mamodupi Mohlala. It was reported that in July 2010, on the day that Nyanda axed Mohlala, she had reported tender irregularities worth ZAR 70 million to the police for a fraud investigation and had reportedly called for disciplinary action against several senior civil servants.

Nyanda fervently denied the allegations calling them "false, spurious and malicious". However, shortly after the story regarding the removal of Mohlala came out, Nyanda was removed from his position as Minister of Communications. Despite the numerous suggestions of political impropriety, Nyanda was subsequently appointed as a parliamentary counselor to ex-President Jacob Zuma.

== Notes ==
Diplomatic posts
Preceded by Mandisi Mpahlwa	High Commissioner to Mozambique; 2020–	incumbent
Government offices
Preceded by Ivy Matsepe-Casaburri	Minister of Communications; 2009–2010	Succeeded by Roy Padayachie
Military offices
Preceded by Georg Meiring	Chief of the South African National Defence Force; 1998–2005	Succeeded by Godfrey Ngwenya
New title	Deputy Chief of the South African National Defence Force; 1997–1998	Succeeded by None
Vacant Title last held by Pierre Steyn in 1993	Chief of Defence Force Staff; 1994–1996	Succeeded by None
Party political offices
Preceded by Chris Hani	Chief of Staff Umkhonto weSizwe; 1992–1994	Integrated into SANDF
