= Andreas Liebenberg =

South African army general (1938–1998)

General Andreas Liebenberg SSAS SD SOE SM MMM
- Born: 18 April 1938; Upington, Cape Province, South Africa
- Died: 23 May 1998 (aged 60); Pretoria, Gauteng, South Africa
- Spouse: Helena Johanna (Crafford)
- Military career
- Allegiance: South Africa
- Branch: South African Army
- Service years: 1955–1993
- Rank: General
- Nickname: Kat
- Commands: Chief of the South African Defence Force (1990–1993); Chief of the Army (1985–1990); South African Special Forces (1982–1985); 2 Military Area (1977–1980)
- Conflicts: South African Border War
- Awards

General Andreas "Kat" Liebenberg SSAS SD SOE SM MMM (18 April 1938 – 23 May 1998) was a South African military commander. He served as General Officer Commanding South African Special Forces (1982–85), Chief of the Army (1985–90) and Chief of the South African Defence Force (1990–93).

== Military career ==
Liebenberg joined the South African Army in 1955 and, after obtaining a BA Law degree at the University of Stellenbosch, was commissioned in 1961.

Liebenberg was posted to London as a military attache in 1969. In 1972, he returned from London to become second in command of the Army Gymnasium. Two years later he was back at Army Headquarters as a Staff Officer before becoming Director Infantry and, in December 1977, as a colonel, Officer Commanding 2 Military Area (later called Sector 10) at Oshakati. He stayed there till January 1980, when he became Director of Operations at Army Headquarters in the rank of brigadier.

Liebenberg served as General Officer Commanding South African Special Forces from 1982 to 1985, as Chief of the Army from 1985 to 1990, as Chief of Defence Force Staff for a few months in 1990, and then as Chief of the South African Defence Force from 1990 to 1993. He was a member of the defence committee of the Transitional Executive Council which supervised the South African government during the final months leading up the first democratic election in 1994.

== Trial ==
In 1995, Liebenberg, former defence minister, General Magnus Malan, and former defence force chief, General Jannie Geldenhuys were tried for murder, as a result of a military operation in which several civilians had been killed. They were all acquitted.

== Awards and decorations ==
- Star of South Africa (Silver) (SSAS)
- Southern Cross Decoration (SD)
- South African Police Star for Outstanding Service (SOE)
- Southern Cross Medal (1975) (SM)
- Military Merit Medal (MMM)
- Pro Patria Medal
- Southern Africa Medal
- General Service Medal (South Africa)
- Good Service Medal (Gold (30 Years))
- Good Service Medal (Silver (20 Years))
- Good Service Medal (Bronze (10 Years))
- Order of the Cloud and Banner (2^{nd} Grade - with Grand Cordon) (ORB)

Military offices
Preceded by Johannes Geldenhuys	Chief of the South African Defence Force; 1990–1993	Succeeded by Georg Meiring
Preceded by Ian Gleeson	Chief of Defence Force Staff; 1990	Succeeded by Marthinus Bekker
Preceded by Johannes Geldenhuys	Chief of the Army; 1985–1990	Succeeded by Georg Meiring
Preceded by Fritz Loots	GOC South African Special Forces; 1982–1985	Succeeded by Joep Joubert
