= Pierre van Ryneveld =

South African military commander

General Sir Helperus Andreas (Pierre) van Ryneveld KBE CB DSO MC
- Born: 2 May 1891; Senekal, Orange Free State
- Died: 2 December 1972 (aged 81); Pretoria, South Africa
- Spouse: Enid Kathleen Helen Collard (1901 – 1958)
- Children: Son: John Frederick Van Ryneveld (1923 – 1996)
- Military career
- Allegiance: United Kingdom; South Africa
- Branch: Royal Flying Corps; Royal Air Force; South African Air Force
- Service years: 1915–1949
- Rank: General
- Nickname: Pierre
- Commands: Chief of the General Staff of the Union Defence Force; Director of Air Services; South African Military College; No. 45 Squadron RFC
- Wars: First World War; Second World War
- Awards: Order of the Bath CB Distinguished Service Order DSO Military Cross MC War Medal 1939 – 1945 MID

General Sir Helperus Andreas van Ryneveld KBE CB DSO MC (2 May 1891 – 2 December 1972), known as Sir Pierre van Ryneveld, was a South African military commander. He was the founding commander of the South African Air Force.

== Military career ==
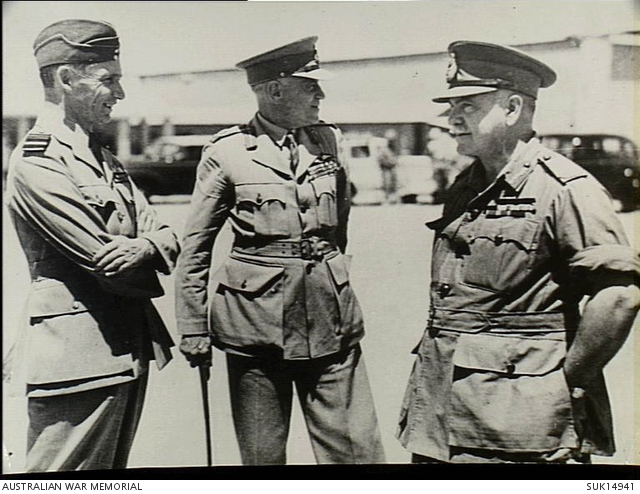
Middle East. C. 1941. Group portrait of Air Marshal A. W. Tedder, Air Officer C-in-C of RAF Middle East (left), Lieutenant General Sir Pierre van Ryneveld, Chief of the General Staff South African Forces (centre), and Lieutenant General Sir Thomas Blamey, Deputy C-in-C Middle East

Van Ryneveld began his military career in the First World War, in which he served in the Loyal North Lancashire Regiment, transferring in April 1915 to the Royal Flying Corps, later the Royal Air Force. For his service in the war, Van Ryneveld was awarded the Distinguished Service Order and Military Cross, Mentioned in Despatches and presented with the Chevalier of the Legion of Honour from the French government.

After the war, Van Ryneveld was called back to South Africa by the Prime Minister Jan Smuts in order to set up the South African Air Force (SAAF). He flew back home, across Africa, in a Vickers Vimy – a pioneering feat for which he and his co-pilot Quintin Brand were both knighted. (Note: The citation for his Knighthood reads as follows: 14 May 1920 - Lieutenant-Colonel Hesperus Andrias Van Ryneveld, DSO, MC, late Royal Air Force - Appointed a Knight Commander of the Order of the British Empire in recognition of the valuable services rendered to Aviation by the successful flight from England to Cape Town, South Africa.)

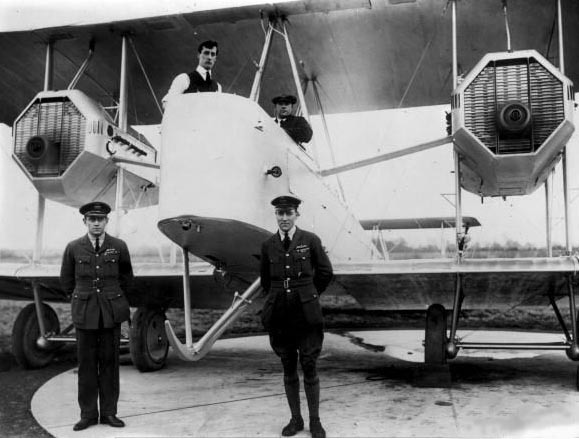
(L-R) Lt Col van Ryneveld with First Lt Quintin Brand, February 1920, in front of Vickers Vimy Silver Queen, before their England to South Africa flight

Colonel van Ryneveld established the SAAF in 1920, and directed it until 1933, when he was promoted to Chief of the General Staff (CGS), in command of the Union Defence Forces. However, for the next four years the SAAF remained under Van Ryneveld's direct control as no one was appointed as the Air Force's director until 1937.

In 1925, then Lt-Col van Ryneveld took part in the government's suppression of the Baster Council's rebellion.

In 1928 van Ryneveld personally led an airborne expedition by new Board members of the Kruger National Park to investigate the effect of low-flying airplanes on game. The Board members included Deneys Reitz and General W.E.C. Tanner, who used the data from this trip to frame regulations on flying over the Park.

Van Ryneveld served as CGS for sixteen years, including the whole of the Second World War. During the war he flew South African Prime Minister Jan Smuts and his deputy Deneys Reitz on a reconnaissance mission over the Kunene River and Ovamboland to survey the northern defences of South West Africa. He was made a Companion of the Order of the Bath in 1945 and retired in 1949.

== Honours ==
- Order of the British Empire (Knight Commander) (KBE), Civil Division
- Order of the Bath (Companion) (CB)
- Distinguished Service Order (DSO)
- Military Cross (MC)
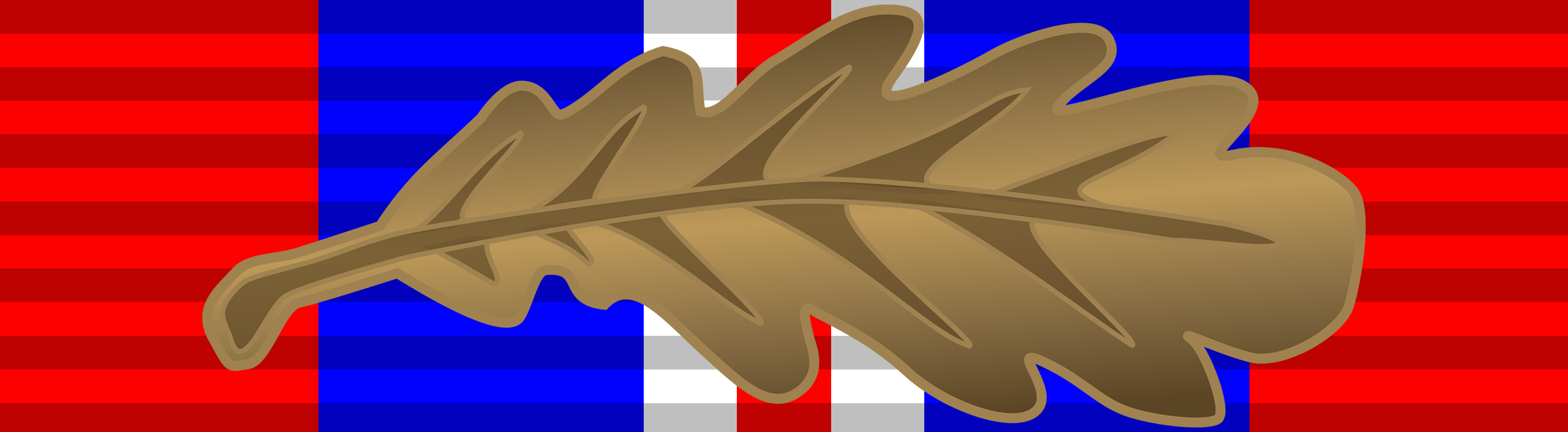
- War Medal 1939 – 1945 (Mentioned in Dispatches) (MID)
- Chevalier of the Legion of Honour (France)

== Namesakes and legacy ==
The Centurion suburb of Pierre van Ryneveld Park was named in his honour and the airport just north of Upington in the Northern Cape is also named after Van Ryneveld. Sir Pierre van Ryneveld High School in Kempton Park, Gauteng is also named after him. The SAAF's annual air power symposium, is known as the Sir Pierre Van Ryneveld Air Power Symposium.

== Notes ==
Military offices
Preceded by W R Read	Officer Commanding No. 45 Squadron RFC; April – August 1917	Succeeded by Arthur Harris
Preceded by Ewan Christian	Officer Commanding South African Military College; 1929–1932	Succeeded by George Brink
New title South African Air Force established	Director Air Services, South African Air Force; From 1933 to 1937 SAAF remained under van Ryneveld's direct control 1920–1933	Vacant Title next held by Francis Hoare in 1937
Preceded by Andries Brink	Chief of the General Staff of the Union Defence Force; 1933–1949	Succeeded by Leonard Beyers
