= Hendrik Klopper =

South African military commander during World War II

General Hendrik Balzazar Klopper DSO
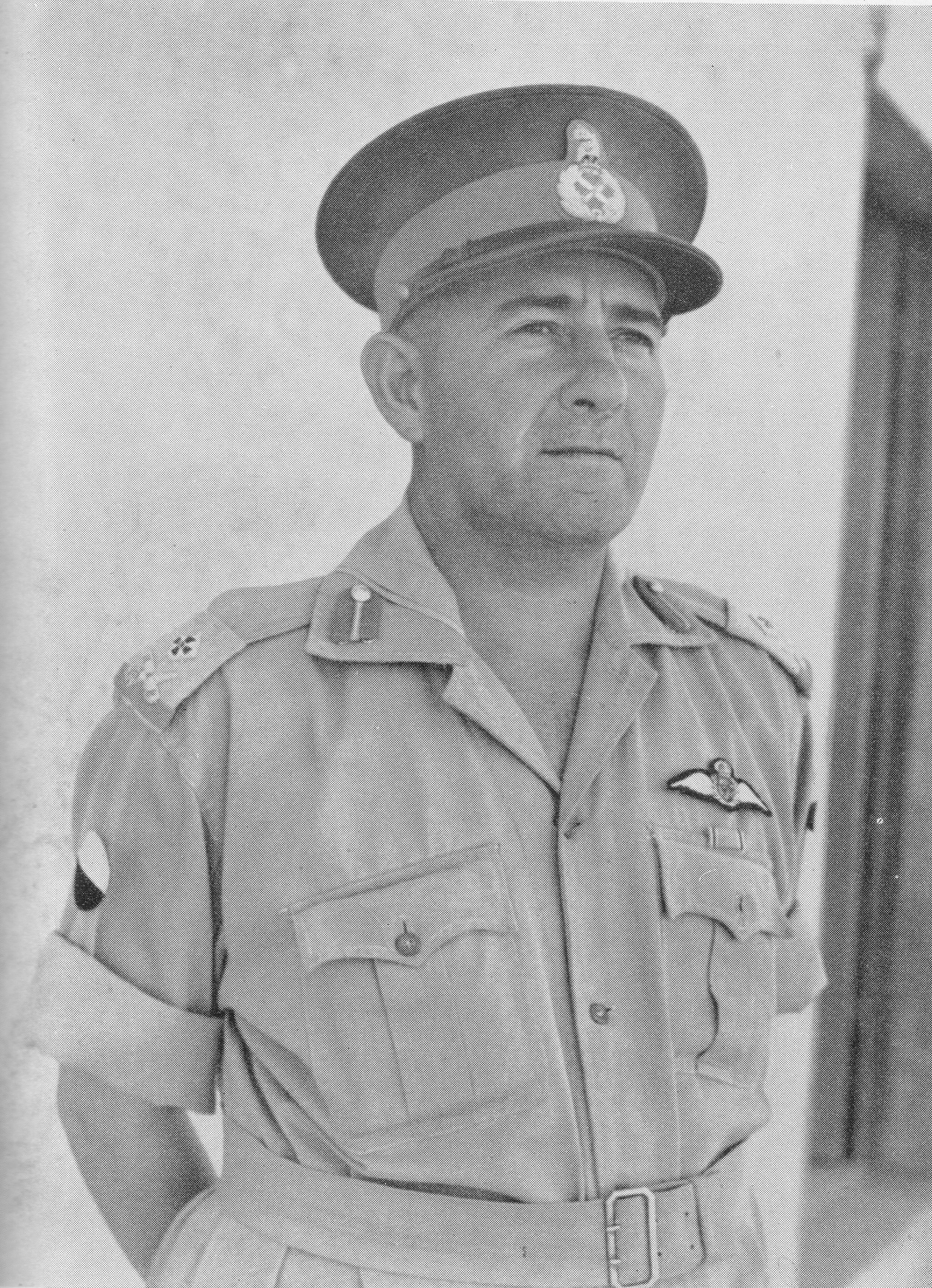
- Major General Hendrik Klopper in June 1942
- Born: 25 September 1903
- Died: 30 December 1977 (aged 74)
- Military career
- Allegiance: South Africa
- Branch: South African Army
- Service years: 1924–1958
- Rank: General
- Service number: 279249
- Commands: Commandant General of the Union Defence Force (1956–58); Army Chief of Staff (1950–53); Northern Command (1945–50); South African Army College (1944–45); 2nd Infantry Division (1942); 3rd Infantry Brigade (1942); 1 Special Service Battalion (1938–39)
- Conflicts: Second World War: Western Desert Campaign
- Awards: Distinguished Service Order DSO

General Hendrik Balzazar Klopper (also Balthazar), DSO was a South African military commander. He commanded the 3rd Infantry Brigade and was later promoted to command the 2nd Infantry Division during the Western Desert Campaign of the Second World War. He is best known for surrendering the Division to Rommel after the failed defence of the Tobruk harbour in June 1942. After the war, he became Army Chief of Staff from 1950 to 1953, and Commandant General of the Union Defence Force from 1956 until his retirement in 1958.

== Military career ==
Klopper joined the South African Army in 1924.

=== World War II ===
During the Second World War, he commanded the 3rd Infantry Brigade in the North African Campaign, for which he was awarded the Distinguished Service Order. He then briefly commanded 2nd Infantry Division. As fortress commander, Klopper was forced to surrender Tobruk and its garrison to Axis forces on 21 June 1942. He escaped from captivity in 1943 and was exonerated by a 1942 Court of Inquiry into the Tobruk disaster.

=== South African Army College ===
Klopper was Officer Commanding the South African Army College from 1944 to 1945, before being appointed in command of Northern Command in 1945.

=== Post-war ===
Klopper served as Army Chief of Staff from 1951 to 1953, as Inspector-General from 1953 to 1956, and as Commandant General of the Union Defence Force from 1956 to 1958.

Military offices
Preceded by Christiaan du Toit	Commandant General of the Union Defence Force; 1956–1958	Succeeded by Stephen Melville
New title Retitled from Director-General of Land Forces	Army Chief of Staff; 1951–1953	Succeeded by Pieter Grobbelaar
Preceded by Christiaan du Toit	Director-General of Land Forces; 1950–1951	Retitled Army Chief of Staff
Preceded by Jock Kriegler	Officer Commanding South African Army College; 1944–1945	Succeeded by SJ Joubert
Preceded by JR Wocke	Commanding Officer 1 Special Service Battalion; 1938–1939	Succeeded by Pik van Noorden
