= Carlo Gagiano =

South African Air Force General (born 1951)

Lieutenant General Carlo Gagiano PG SM MMM
- Born: 26 March 1951 (age 75); Bonnievale, Western Cape
- Spouse: Leonie Minnie (m. 1974)
- Military career
- Allegiance: South Africa
- Branch: South African Air Force
- Service years: 1968–2012
- Rank: Lieutenant General
- Nickname: Call sign: Kattie
- Unit: South African Air Force
- Commands: Chief of the South African Air Force; Chief Director Operational Development Joint Operations Division; Inspector General of the South African Air Force; Officer Commanding Central Flying School SAAF; Air Force Attaché and Defence Attaché to Israel; Officer Commanding 89 Combat Flying School; Officer Commanding 3 Squadron SAAF
- Conflicts: Border War; Operation Modular
- Awards: iPhrothiya yeGolide PG Southern Cross Medal SM Military Merit Medal MMM Pro Patria Medal Southern Africa Medal General Service Medal (South Africa) Unitas (Unity) Medal Mandela Commemoration Medal Medalje vir Troue Diens (Medal for Loyal Service) Good Service Medal
- Other work: Aerospace Advisor to Chairman of Paramount Group

Lieutenant-General Carlo Gagiano PG SM MMM (born 26 March 1951, Bonnievale, Western Cape) is a retired South African military officer and former Chief of the South African Air Force. He joined the South African Air Force in 1968, and served in the Border War in South West Africa in the 1980s.

== Early and personal life ==
Carlo Gagiano was born on 26 March 1951, the son of Arnoldus Johannes Kennedy Gagiano and Sophia Christina Maria Gagiano (née Esterhuizen). He completed his secondary school education at Clanwilliam High School in December 1967.

Gagiano married Leonie Minnie in 1974. He is an enthusiastic succulent collector and a keen reader of Second World War aviation.

== Air Force career ==
After completing his basic military training, Gagiano started his South African Air Force career as a student pilot on the AerMacchi MB-326M in July 1968 at Flying Training School Langebaanweg. After completing his "wings test", on 28 August 1969, he was transferred to Advanced Flying School Pietersburg for a Vampire Conversion Course. He formally received his wings from Lieutenant General Jacobus Verster at Flying Training School Langebaanweg on 5 December 1969 and was promoted to 2nd Lieutenant. Early in 1970, he returned to Advanced Flying School Pietersburg for a Vampire Operational Conversion Course. He completed the OCC in July 1970 and was transferred to 1 Squadron flying the F 86 Sabre, which was primarily used to prepare young fighter pilots for conversion on the Mirage III aircraft.

After spending a year at 1 Squadron, he was transferred to 2 Squadron flying the Mirage III at Air Force Base Waterkloof in Pretoria. He celebrated his 21st birthday at Flying Training School Langebaanweg on an air-to-air firing weapons camp. During his tour at 2 Squadron, he was promoted to lieutenant on 5 December 1971 and to captain on 1 December 1974. 2 Squadron, operating the Mirage III B, C, D E, R, D2 and R2 versions specialising in air superiority, ground attack and tactical reconnaissance. As part of his development, he did a Photo-Reconnaissance Course and a Junior Joint Warfare Course during this period. Gagiano became the squadron display pilot during the latter part of his tour at 2 Squadron.

1976 started with a transfer to 3 Squadron flying the new Mirage F1 CZ from Air Force Base Waterkloof. The squadron specialised in air superiority, with ground attack as a secondary role. He completed the South African Air Force Pilot Attack Instructors Course at 85 Combat Flying School on 20 January 1978. In December, he did his first operational mission escorting a Mirage III R2Z on a tactical reconnaissance mission followed in March and June 1979 with more operational combat air patrol, escorting and armed reconnaissance missions.

In July 1979, he was transferred to Central Flying School Dunnottar to do a basic flying instructors course on the T6 Harvard. The course included a conversion onto the Harvard, and immediately after that, the instructor's course. He was promoted to major on 1 January 1980 and qualified as a flying instructor on 18 February. After giving 254 hours of flying instruction year-end, he was transferred to 85 Combat Flying School at Air Force Base Pietersburg.

85 Combat Flying School Impala Flight operated the trusted AerMacchi MB 326M and 326K models. However, increasing demand for combat pilots demanded high-intensity instructional flying in the air-to-air and air-to-ground roles with an escalating Angolan conflict. By July 1981, Gagiano started flying the Mirage III again at 85 Combat Flying School's Mirage Flight. Shortly after that, the unit deployed to Air Force Base Ondangwa and flew close air support and escort missions. During this period, on 27 August, with a rocket attack on Ongiva in Southern Angola, a SAM 7 hit his leader, who landed safely at Ondangwa. On 3 April 1984, he completed 1,000 flying hours on the Mirage III and received a certificate personally signed by Marcel Dassault, the designer of the Mirage III.

On 1 January 1985, Gagiano was promoted to commandant (lieutenant colonel), spent four months as Staff Officer Mirages at Air Force Head Quarters, followed by the Air Force Senior Command and Staff Course for the rest of the year.

In 1986 Gagiano received a command appointment as the officer commanding 3 Squadron operating Mirage F1 CZ aircraft from Air Force Base Waterkloof. During his tenure, the war in Angola escalated further, and the squadron deployed numerous times and mainly operated from Air Force Base Rundu in South West Africa, now Namibia. The squadron flew escort and air defence missions. Providing air cover for the SA Army in the battle for Cuito Cuanavale was a geographical challenge. The closest airbase and air defence radar were 160 nautical miles to the south. The MiG-23s operated minutes from their base while the radar horizon for the South Africans was 20,000 feet over the battle area. The most challenging disparity was that the MiG-23s had all-sector missiles against the Mirage F1 with only a rear sector. The Mirage F1s intercepted the MiGs by ingressing at a low level, communicating to the radar operators through an airborne pilot relaying the messages to increase the surprise factor. The F1s intercepted two MiG formations during September 1987, one inconclusive when the missile exploded in the afterburner plume behind the target aircraft. With the second interception, the air defence radar at Rundu lost the targets at a critical time before the F1s could make visual contact. The MiG-23s launched their missiles when the F1s obtained visual contact after the initial cross, and the number two F1 sustained damage after the explosion. Air Force Base Rundu was not optimally suited for high-performance fighter aircraft, and the pilot could not stop on the runway. When the nosewheel collapsed after the upwind threshold, the ejection seat fired, seriously injuring the pilot. In both these cases, Gagiano was on cockpit standby and had to scramble.

Nearing the end of his tour at 3 Squadron, Gagiano passed the 1,000 flying hour mark on the Mirage F1 CZ during a deployment to Air Force Base Langebaanweg.

A further command appointment followed in January 1989 for Gagiano, serving as the officer commanding 89 Combat Flying School operating Cheetah D aircraft from Air Force Base Pietersburg. He also attended a military attaché course to prepare for his deployment as the Air Force attaché to Israel during his tenure. The couple arrived in Israel in late December 1989, with Gagiano now newly promoted to colonel, during increasing tension in the Middle East. When the air war started in Iraq and Israel began being targeted by Scud missiles, the defence office moved temporarily out of Tel Aviv to his residence for increased safety.

By 1994 and back in South Africa, Gagiano completed the South African National Defence Force's Joint Staff Course at the South African Defence College.

By January 1995, he was appointed as Officer Commanding Central Flying School Langebaanweg. During his tenure, he oversaw the phasing out of the Harvard and phasing in of the Pilatus PC 7 Mk 2 as the new basic training aircraft of the South African Air Force.

In early 1999, back in Pretoria, he was promoted to brigadier general and appointed as Inspector General of the Air Force. The following two years stood him in good stead for the future as he did inspections across the length and breadth of the Air Force.

On 1 November 2000, he was promoted to major general and appointed as Chief Director Operational Development at the Joint Operations Division, responsible for Joint Force Employment Strategy, Concepts of Operation and Joint Doctrine. Gagiano was also tasked to lead the reorganisation of the Joint Operations Division.

Major General Gagiano returned to the Air Force and was given the Chief Director Air Policy and Plans portfolio. He was subsequently promoted to lieutenant general on 1 May 2005 and appointed as Chief of the South African Air Force. During his tenure, the Air Force introduced four new air systems into operations, and in addition, the indigenous Rooivalk combat support helicopter's development was completed and also inducted into service.

After a thorough preparation with the newly acquired Gripen and Hawk aircraft, controlled by the Air Force's static and mobile radars, the Air Force conducted a successful joint air policing service during the 2010 Soccer World Cup.

Gagiano, throughout his tenure, promoted good relations with air force commanders and specifically those of Southern Africa by the support of multi-national exercises and the building of personal relationships.

Gagiano handed over command to Lieutenant General Fabian Msimang in a ceremony on 28 September 2012.

== Aircraft flown ==
- Aermacchi MB-326M & K
- De Havilland Vampire
- Canadair Sabre Mk.6
- Mirage III
- Mirage F1CZ
- North American Harvard
- Denel Cheetah D and E
- Pilatus PC-7
- Pilatus PC-12

== Awards and decorations ==
Lieutenant General Gagiano has been awarded the following medals and decorations:

- iPhrothiya yeGolide (Golden Protea) (PG)
- Southern Cross Medal (1975) (SM)
- Military Merit Medal (MMM)
- Pro Patria Medal
- Southern Africa Medal
- General Service Medal (South Africa)
- Unitas (Unity) Medal
- Mandela Commemoration Medal (Gold)
- Medalje vir Troue Diens (Medal for Loyal Service) (40 Year Clasp)
- Good Service Medal (Gold (30 Years))
- Good Service Medal (Silver (20 Years))
- Good Service Medal (Bronze (10 Years))
- Commander of the Order of the Polar Star (Sweden)
- Legion of Honour (France)
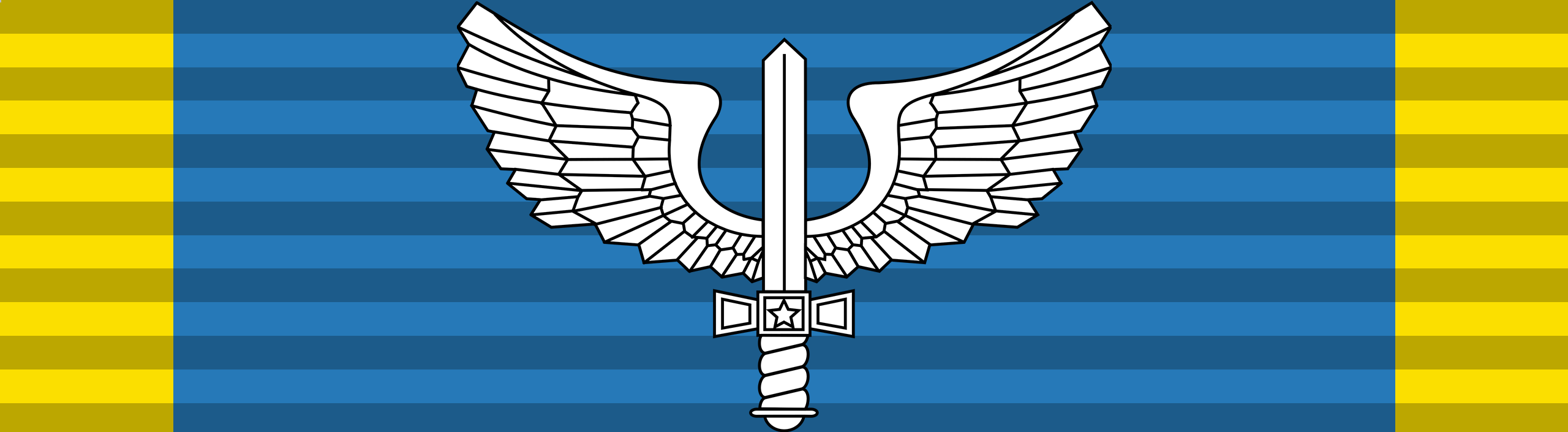
- Medal of Merit Santos Dumont (Brazil)
- Pro Memoria Medal (Poland)

Pilots Wings (Qualification)
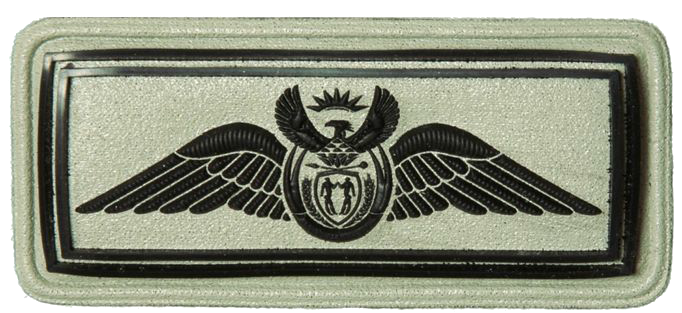
2500 plus hrs. Black on Thatch beige, Embossed. National Coat of Arms with large wings enclosed by two black rectangles

Internal Audit Practitioner (Qualification)
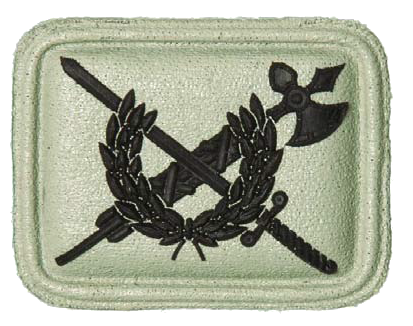
Black on Thatch beige, Embossed. Internal Audit Investigation

== See also ==
- List of South African military chiefs
- South African Air Force

Military offices
Preceded by Roelf Beukes	Chief of the South African Air Force; 2005–2012	Succeeded by Fabian Msimang
Preceded by Lucky Ngema	Chief Director Air Policy & Plans; 2004–2005	Succeeded by Mandla Mangethe
Preceded by HAP Potgieter	Chief Director Operations Development Joint Operations; 2000–2003	Succeeded by Matthys Janse van Rensburg
Preceded by Lucky Ngema	Inspector General South African Air Force; 1998–2000	Succeeded by Charl D. Eksteen
