= Leonard Beyers =

South African Army general (1894–1959)

- Born: 22 January 1894; Kimberley, Cape Colony
- Died: 15 April 1959 (aged 65); East London, Eastern Cape
- Spouse: Evelyn Alice Jess Hunter
- Military career
- Allegiance: South Africa
- Branch: South African Army
- Service years: 1913–1954
- Rank: Lieutenant General
- Nickname: Len
- Commands: Chief of the General Staff of the Union Defence Force; Defence Rifle Association; No. 5 Military District
- Conflicts: First World War; Bondelswarts Rebellion; Second World War

Lieutenant General Leonard Beyers (22 January 1894 – 15 April 1959) was a South African soldier. Although he never saw active service in the field during the two world wars, he became Chief of the General Staff in command of the Union Defence Force in 1949. He resigned after only a short time in this position, citing the interference in military matters by Minister of Defence Frans Erasmus as the reason for his resignation.

== Early life ==
Leonard Beyers was born in Kimberley, Cape Colony on 22 January 1894 to Pieter Gerhard Beyers and his wife, Anna Maria Elizabeth Bredell.

== Military career ==
After his schooling, Beyers followed a career in the army. In 1913 he was attached to the Royal Scots Fusiliers, with whom he trained while they were at Roberts Heights. After his initial training he was commissioned in the Witwatersrand Rifles.

In 1914, after four months service at the Military School in Bloemfontein, Beyers was appointed to the Permanent Force with the rank of lieutenant. He served as adjutant of units in Bloemfontein, Standerton and Cape Town. In 1915, at the latter posting, he was promoted to the rank of captain. He was stationed in Cape Town for the greater part of the First World War. In 1917, he was transferred to Johannesburg and in 1918 he became deputy assistant adjutant-general at Defence Headquarters, Pretoria.

While Beyers was a staff officer to the Cape Peninsula Garrison in 1922, he saw active service on the only occasion in his entire life. He served as a member of the force which suppressed the Bondelswarts Rebellion.

Beyers acted as aide-de-camp to the Governor-General, the Earl of Athlone in 1924–25. He then attended staff courses in England.

On his return to South Africa in 1927, Beyers was appointed officer instructor at the Military College at Roberts Heights. In the next four years he acted on occasion as commandant of the college and of Roberts Heights. This gave him the opportunity to develop his abilities as a military leader.

In 1928, Beyers was promoted to the rank of major and as a result of his increased responsibilities he was promoted to lieutenant colonel in 1930. In 1931, he was appointed commanding officer of No. 5 Military District Pretoria.

In 1932, Beyers was appointed director (military) of Prison Services. As a result of this move he was placed on the reserve of officers. According to the 2005 Jali Commission, the military nature of the pre-1994 South African Prisons Service was put in place with the appointment of Beyers as Director of Prisons. The structure, mode of dress and the institutional culture was military in every respect, indicated by a rank structure similar to that used in the army and the requirement that non-commissioned members salute commissioned members. The demilitarisation of the correctional system was finally effected by the post-Apartheid government on 1 April 1996.

In 1937, Beyers returned to the Permanent Force as assistant commandant-in-chief, Burger Commandos. Later that year he was promoted to the rank of brigadier general. On the outbreak of the Second World War, he relinquished his post in favour of becoming director-general of the Defence Rifle Association, a post he held for almost a year before becoming Adjutant-general. He visited South African troops in the Middle East and acted as Chief of the General Staff when General Sir Pierre van Ryneveld was in North Africa.

Beyers gave up his post as Adjutant-general in 1945 owing to ill health and was placed on the retired list four months later. His retirement was short lived, however, for in 1949 he was appointed acting Chief of the General Staff with the rank of lieutenant general. On 2 May 1949, he succeeded Van Ryneveld as Chief of the General Staff. He remained in this position for only a short time, resigning on 15 March 1950. The reason for his resignation was the interference in military matters and appointment of staff without consultation by Frans Erasmus, the Minister of Defence. Before resigning, Beyers had lengthy correspondence with both Erasmus and the Prime Minister, D. F. Malan, on the matter:

My resignation was in fact tendered as far back as November 1949, in protest against the unconstitutional and unwarranted interference in the functions of the Chief of General Staff who, in fact and in law, is the Commander-in-Chief of the Forces in South Africa. The facts are that the Minister sought to change the strategic dispositions of units and to appoint, promote, and transfer both officers and other ranks, without sufficient knowledge of their qualifications and without reference to the General Staff, of which I was the head. Without reference to me, he created posts for the absorption of persons in whom, irrespective of their unsuitability or otherwise, he personally reposed political confidence. Political ambitions ... should not be allowed to intrude into the responsibility of command and functions of military organizations.

Beyers was once again placed on the retired list in 1954.

The fact that at times he acted as Chief of the General Staff during the Second World War indicates that Van Ryneveld had immense trust in Beyers' abilities. However, Van Ryneveld was such a dominating personality that any meaningful delegation of his authority was never even discussed.

== Medals ==
During his career, Beyers was awarded the British War Medal for his services during the First World War, and the War Medal 1939-45 and Africa Service Medal for the Second World War. Probably because he never saw active service in the field during the two world wars he would not wear ribbons on his uniform.

== Family life ==
Beyers married Evelyn Alice Jess Hunter and had a son and a daughter. He died in East London, Eastern Cape Province on 15 April 1959.

Military offices
Preceded by Sir Pierre van Ryneveld	Chief of the General Staff of the Union Defence Force; 1949–1950	Succeeded by Christiaan du Toit
