= James Kriel =

Lieutenant General James Kriel SSAS SD SM MMM
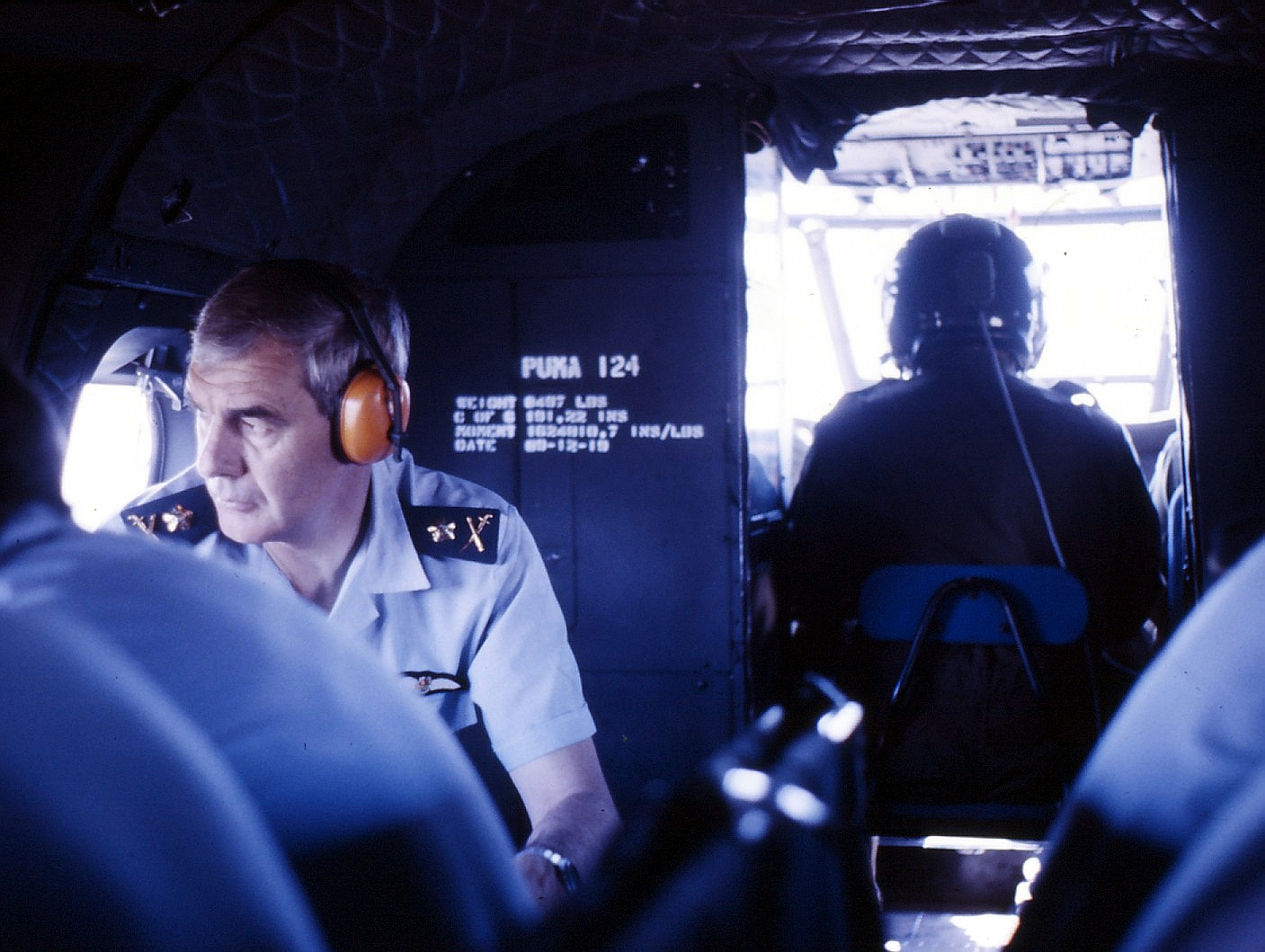
- Born: 8 March 1942; Cape Town, South Africa
- Died: 18 July 2016 (aged 74); Bredasdorp, South Africa
- Military career
- Allegiance: South Africa
- Branch: South African Air Force
- Service years: 1959–1996
- Rank: Lieutenant General
- Commands: Chief of the Air Force; OC AFB Ysterplaat; OC 35 Squadron SAAF
- Awards

Lieutenant-General James Kriel SSAS SD SM MMM (8 March 1942 – 18 July 2016) was a South African military commander. He joined the South African Air Force in 1959.

== Background ==
Kriel attended Tygerberg High School before doing a pilot course in 1959. He served as OC 35 Squadron SAAF at AFB Ysterplaat from 1974 to 1977, flying the Avro Shackleton. He later served as Officer Commanding AFB Ysterplaat as a colonel before being transferred to Headquarters in the role of director air planning as a brigadier.

Kriel was promoted to Chief of Air Staff Operations as a major general in 1986, followed by Chief of Air Force staff till 1991, when he was promoted to lieutenant general and appointed Chief of the Air Force.

Kriel died on 18 July 2016 at the age of 74. He married Nellie Toerien on 4 August 1963. She was the daughter of Mattheus and Catharina (Née Bosman)

== Honours and awards ==
He was awarded the Order of the Star of South Africa (Silver) in 1994.

- Star of South Africa (Silver) (SSAS)
- Southern Cross Decoration (SD)
- Southern Cross Medal (1975) (SM)
- Military Merit Medal (MMM)
- Pro Patria Medal
- Southern Africa Medal
- General Service Medal (South Africa)
- Unitas (Unity) Medal
- Good Service Medal (Gold (30 Years))
- Good Service Medal (Silver (20 Years))
- Good Service Medal (Bronze (10 Years))
- Legion of Merit (Commander) (LOM) (USA)
- Order of the Cloud and Banner (3^{rd} Grade - with Yellow Grand Cordon) (ORB) (Taiwan)
- Order of Precious Tripod (with Red Grand Cordon) (Taiwan)

== See also ==
- List of South African military chiefs
- South African Air Force

Military offices
Preceded by Jan van Loggerenberg	Chief of the South African Air Force; 1991–1996	Succeeded by Willem Hechter
Preceded by Dries van der Lith	Chief of Air Force Staff; 1990–1991	Unknown
Preceded by Pierre Steyn	Chief of Air Staff Operations; 1990	Succeeded by AH Repsold
Preceded by Daniel Knobel	Deputy Chief of Staff Operations; 1987–1990	Succeeded by Pierre Steyn
Unknown	Chief of Air Staff Operations; 1986–1987	Succeeded by Pierre Steyn
