= Hugo Biermann =

South African Navy admiral (1916–2012)

Admiral Hugo Hendrik Biermann SSA SD OBE
- Born: 6 August 1916; Johannesburg, Transvaal, South Africa
- Died: 27 March 2012 (aged 95); Cape Town, Western Cape, South Africa
- Spouse: Margaret (Peggy) Cruyws (m. 1940; died 2008)
- Relatives: Rear Admiral Stephanus Biermann
- Military career
- Allegiance: South Africa
- Branch: South African Navy
- Service years: 1938–1976
- Rank: Admiral
- Service number: 01222819PE
- Commands: Chief of the South African Defence Force; Chief of the Navy; HMSAS Bloemfontein; HMSAS Gamtoos; HMSAS Aristea; HMSAS Roodepoort; HMSAS Imhoff
- Conflicts: Second World War
- Awards: Star of South Africa SSAG Southern Cross Decoration SD Queen Elizabeth II Coronation Medal Order of the British Empire OBE Union Medal 1939–45 Star Atlantic Star Africa Star Italy Star War Medal 1939–1945 Africa Service Medal (WWII) Order of May (Naval Merit) Order of Prince Henry GCIH

Hugo Hendrik Biermann,(6 August 1916 – 27 March 2012) was a senior officer in the South African Navy. He served as Chief of the Navy from 1952 to 1972 and Chief of the South African Defence Force from 1972 until 1976, the only naval officer to have served in the post.

== Early life ==
Biermann's father, also named Hugo Hendrick, joined the Orange Free State postal service at the age of 12, and later joined the South African Railways and Harbours as a telegraphist. Born in Johannesburg on 6 August 1916, Biermann was one of four children. His brothers Phillip and Stefanus (Chips) served on whalecatchers that had been converted to minesweepers during the Second World War. His brother Stefanus reached the rank of rear admiral in the South African Navy. Biermann started school in the Transvaal until his father was transferred to Cape Town. He completed his schooling at Jan van Riebeeck High School and, after leaving school at the age of 16, joined the South African Training Ship General Botha.

After two years training on the General Botha from 1932 to 1933, Biermann entered the British Merchant Navy as a cadet and served until 1938, when he was transferred to the Maritime Department of the South African Railways and Harbours.

== Career ==
=== Second World War ===
Biermann began his naval career in 1938 as a sub-lieutenant in the Royal Naval Volunteer Reserve. In January 1940, he was called up for full-time service and transferred to the Seaward Defence Force. Promoted lieutenant in mid 1941 he commanded HMSAS Imhoff, HMSAS Roodepoort and HMSAS Aristea, before being promoted to lieutenant commander in command of the salvage vessel HMSAS Gamtoos.

The crew of the HMSAS Gamtoos cleared several Mediterranean ports of sunken and scuttled ships, and at Marseilles, Biermann blew a hole in the harbour wall so that he could enter the Vieux Port and begin work. The Gamtoos went on to salvage the Sidi Aissa, towing it away to clear the valuable graving dock at La Ciotat by 14 December 1944. This earned Biermann appointment as an Officer of the Order of the British Empire (OBE) (Military Division). The citation for his OBE reads:

On the recommendation of the British Admiralty, the then Lieutenant-Commander H. H. Biermann, an officer in the South African Naval Forces [SANF], was appointed an Officer of the Military Division of the Order of the British Empire "for distinguished service during the invasion of Southern France."

=== Post-war and rise to senior command ===
After the Second World War, and with the establishment of the South African Navy (Permanent Force) in May 1946, Biermann was appointed lieutenant commander in the Permanent Force and made captain of the Algerine class minesweeper, HMSAS Bloemfontein, commissioning it in Devonport on 8 September 1947. He was also the Senior Officer of the minesweeping squadron.

In 1950, Biermann was transferred to Defence Headquarters and served on the staff of the then Director-General of the South African Naval Forces. Two years later he attended the British Naval Staff Course at the Royal Naval College, Greenwich, and was appointed as naval attaché at South African House, London with the rank of commander.

=== Frans Erasmus reshuffle ===
Defence Minister Frans Erasmus embarked on a process of ridding the Defence Force of officers associated with the Smuts government and replacing them with others whom he considered more Nationalist, one which Afrikaners would feel more at home. In 1952, Erasmus posted Brigadier Pieter de Waal as a Military attache to the United States, replacing him with Biermann, one of only seven Afrikaans officers in the navy in 1948. Then Commander Biermann was appointed Naval and Marine Chief of Staff (the head of the navy) on 1 December 1952, and promoted to the rank of commodore, jumping two ranks. During his tenure the Simonstown Agreement was signed on 30 June 1955. He held commodore rank until 1 April 1957, with the handing over of the Simon's Town Naval Base, he was promoted to rear admiral. Biermann was made vice admiral on 1 December 1965, when his position was simultaneously retitled as Chief of the Navy.

In 1972, Biermann took over the position of Commandant General of the South African Defence Force and promoted to Admiral, the first time this rank was used in the South African Navy. The title was changed to Chief of the South African Defence Force a year later.

In 1977, Biermann authored 'The South African Response. The Southern Oceans and the Security of the Free World: New Studies in Global Strategy.

The navy's submarine base was named after him.

== Contribution to yachting in South Africa ==
Following the success of Bruce Dalling and the yacht Voortrekker in the 1968 Single-Handed Trans-Atlantic Race, Biermann, then chairman of the Springbok Ocean Racing Trust, suggested that South Africa host an ocean race of its own.

The South African Ocean Racing Trust (as the SAORT became known) selected the Iate Clube do Rio de Janeiro, who were willing to co-operate in the organising of the race and the race would be known as the Cape to Rio. The first race was organised for 1971, with the organisers anticipating at most 15 entries into the race. However, the race attracted a large amount of interest and 58 boats entered the 1971 race.

== Awards and decorations ==
Biermann received the Star of South Africa on 13 May 1960 in recognition of his exceptionally meritorious services. He was the last recipient of this honour prior to the declaration of the Republic of South Africa on 31 May 1961, which has Queen Elizabeth II's royal cypher on the back above the pre-2000 Coat of arms of South Africa. He was also appointed Grand Cross of Naval Merit of the Order of May from Admiral Guillermo Brown of Argentina, and the Knight Grand Cross of the Order of Infante Dom Henrique of Portugal. He was the very first recipient of the Southern Cross Decoration, which he received upon his retirement as Chief of the South African Defence Force in 1976.

- Star of South Africa (Gold) (SSAG)
- Southern Cross Decoration (SD)
- Queen Elizabeth II Coronation Medal (Great Britain)
- Order of the British Empire (OBE) (Great Britain)
- Union Medal
- 1939–45 Star (Great Britain)
- Atlantic Star (Great Britain)
- Africa Star (8th Army Clasp) (Great Britain)
- Italy Star (Great Britain)
- War Medal 1939–1945 (Great Britain)
- Africa Service Medal (WWII) (South Africa)
- Order of May (Naval Merit) (Grand Cross) (Note: Spanish: Orden de Mayo (Al Mérito Naval) - Gran Cruz) (Argentina)
- Order of Prince Henry (Grand Cross) (GCIH) (Note: Portuguese: Grã-Cruz - The star bears the Portuguese inscription Talant de bien faire) (Portugal)

== Personal life ==
In 1940, Biermann married Margaret (Peggy) Cruyws. She died in 2008 at the age of 90. The couple had two children, Hugo Hendrik and Diana. Biermann died on 27 March 2012 at the age of 95 in a retirement home, Silvermine Village, near Cape Town. He was buried with full military honours.

== Notes ==
Military offices
New title Retitled from Commandant General of the South African Defence Force	Chief of the South African Defence Force; 1973 – 1976	Succeeded by Magnus Malan
Preceded by Rudolph Hiemstra	Commandant General of the South African Defence Force; 1972 – 1973	Renamed Chief of the South African Defence Force
New title Retitled from Naval Chief of Staff	Chief of the South African Navy; 1966 – 1972	Succeeded by James Johnson
New title Retitled from Naval and Marine Chief of Staff	Naval Chief of Staff; 1955 – 1966	Renamed Chief of the Navy
Preceded by Pieter de Waal	Naval and Marine Chief of Staff; 1952 – 1955	Renamed Naval Chief of Staff
