= Christiaan du Toit =

South African military commander

Christiaan Ludolph de Wet du Toit
- Born: 23 September 1901
- Died: 14 August 1982 (aged 80)
- Military career
- Allegiance: South Africa
- Branch: South African Army
- Service years: 1924 – 1956
- Rank: Lieutenant General
- Nickname: "Matie"
- Commands: Chief of the General Staff of the Union Defence Force; Director-General of Land Forces; Western Transvaal Command; 1st South African Armoured Brigade; 2nd South African Infantry Brigade
- Conflicts: Second World War
- Awards: Distinguished Service Order; Mentioned in Despatches

Lieutenant General Christiaan Ludolph de Wet du Toit, DSO (23 September 1901 – 14 August 1982) was a South African military commander.

== Military career ==
Du Toit joined the South African Army as an artilleryman in 1924. He completed the British Army Specialist Staff Course in 1936.

During the Second World War, he commanded Divisional artillery in East Africa and North Africa, before commanding the 2nd South African Infantry Brigade in 1942 and the 1st South African Armoured Brigade from 1943 to 1945. For his service, Du Toit was awarded the Distinguished Service Order and Mentioned in Despatches.

Du Toit served as Director-General of Land Forces, the head of the South African Army, from 1948 to 1950, and as Chief of the General Staff of the Union Defence Force, from 1950 to 1956.

Military offices
Preceded by Leonard Beyers	Chief of the General Staff of the Union Defence Force; 1950 – 1956	Succeeded by Hendrik Klopper
New title	Director-General of Land Forces; 1948 – 1950	Succeeded by Hendrik Klopper
Preceded by Unknown as Officer Commanding; Voortrekkerhoogte and Transvaal Command	Officer Commanding Western Transvaal Command; 1946 – 1948	Succeeded by Jock Kriegler
