= Johannes Geldenhuys =

South African Military Officer

General Johannes Geldenhuys SSA SD SOE SM MMM
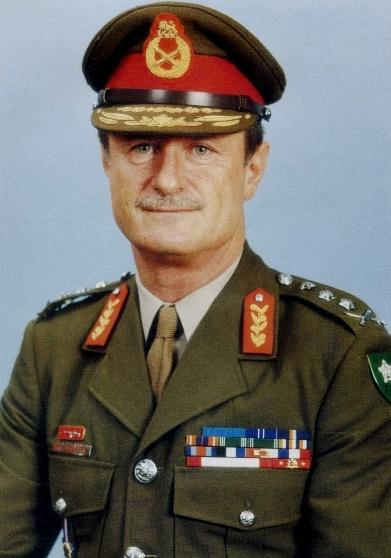
- Johannes Jacobus Geldenhuys
- Born: 5 February 1935; Kroonstad, Orange Free State, South Africa
- Died: 10 September 2018 (aged 83); George, Western Cape, South Africa
- Military career
- Allegiance: South Africa
- Branch: South African Army
- Service years: 1954–1990
- Rank: General
- Commands: Chief of the South African Defence Force (1985–90); Chief of the Army (1980–85); South West Africa Territorial Force (1980); South West Africa Command (1977–80)
- Conflicts: South African Border War
- Awards

General Johannes Jacobus (Jannie) Geldenhuys SSA SD SOE SM MMM (5 February 1935 – 10 September 2018) was a South African military commander who served as Chief of the South African Defence Force from 1985 to 1990.

== Early life ==
Geldenhuys was born in Kroonstad on 5 February 1935. He would later matriculate from Hoërskool Voortrekker in Bethlehem, Orange Free State.

== Military career ==
He joined the army on 4 January 1954 as a candidate officer. Geldenhuys obtained a BMil from the University of Pretoria in 1956 before joining 1 Special Service Battalion. In 1965, he was based at the South African Embassy in Luanda, Angola as a Vice-Consul, a position he held until 1968. He was appointed as Army Chief of Staff Intelligence and then Army Chief of Staff Operations. He went on to high command in the South African Army, serving as commander of South West Africa Command from 1977 until 1980, when he was briefly appointed as General Officer Commanding the South West African Territorial Force. Later in 1980, he became Chief of the Army. Geldenhuys was promoted to general and assumed the position of Chief of the South African Defence Force on 31 October 1985. In this role, he took part in negotiations that brought the Border War to an end in 1989, after 23 years of fighting.

The post-Apartheid Truth and Reconciliation Commission found that when Geldenhuys and General Ian Gleeson were informed that the SADF and Security Branch had assassinated Dr Fabian Ribeiro and his wife Florence Ribeiro on 1 December 1986 they failed to pass this information onto the Attorney-General or the police. The commission concluded that they both "acted in an obstructive way for which they are legally responsible". As part of the Commission's hearings it was alleged that Geldenhuys had also authorised the use of SADF special forces personnel to support the Security Branch's operations within South Africa; he denied having done so.

In 2023, Geldenhuys was named as an accomplice to the torture and murder of anti-apartheid activist Abdullah Haron.

== Death ==
Geldenhuys died on 10 September 2018 due to the effects of Alzheimer's disease. He was survived by his wife Marié, daughters Anna-Marié and Lollie, and son Bruwer. Another son, Martin, predeceased him.

== Medals and decorations ==
- Star of South Africa (Gold) (SSAG)
- Southern Cross Decoration (SD)
- South African Police Star for Outstanding Service (SOE)
- Southern Cross Medal (1952) (SM)
- Military Merit Medal (MMM)
- Pro Patria Medal
- Good Service Medal (Gold (30 Years))
- Good Service Medal (Silver (20 Years))
- Permanent Force Good Service Medal
- Order of Prince Henry (Grand Cross) (GCIH) (Note: Portuguese: Grã-Cruz - The star bears the Portuguese inscription Talant de bien faire) (Portugal) , Knight
- Order Military Merit (Grand Cross) (Paraguay)
- Order of the Cloud and Banner (2^{nd} Grade - with Grand Cordon) (ORB) (Taiwan)
- Military Merit (Grand Star) (Chile)
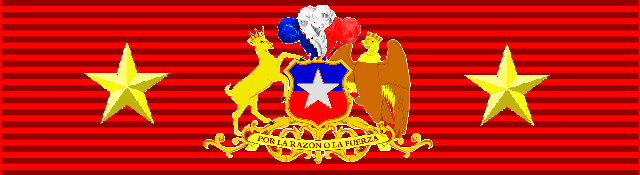
- Order of Military Merit (Grand Officer II) (Brazil)

== Notes ==
Military offices
Preceded by Constand Viljoen	Chief of the South African Defence Force; 1985–1990	Succeeded by Andreas Liebenberg
Preceded by Constand Viljoen	Chief of the Army; 1980–1985	Succeeded by Andreas Liebenberg
Preceded by Brig Louw Oosthuizen	GOC South West Africa Territorial Force; 1977–1980	Succeeded by Maj Gen Charles Lloyd
Preceded by Brig Ben de Wet Roos	Officer Commanding South West Africa Command; 1973–1974	Succeeded by Brig Dirk Marais
