= Daniel Knobel =

South African general and doctor (1936–2021)

Lieutenant General Daniel Pieter Knobel SSAS SD SOE SM MMM KStJ MBC HB
- Born: 29 November 1936; Edinburgh, Scotland
- Died: 22 July 2021 (aged 84); Pretoria, South Africa
- Relatives: Tersia (wife)
- Military career
- Allegiance: South Africa
- Branch: South African Military Health Service
- Rank: Lieutenant General
- Nickname: Niel
- Awards: Star of South Africa SSAS Southern Cross Decoration SD South African Police Star for Outstanding Service SOE Southern Cross Medal SM Military Merit Medal MMM Pro Patria Medal Southern Africa Medal General Service Medal (South Africa) Unitas (Unity) Medal Good Service Medal Venerable Order of Saint John KStJ

Daniel Pieter 'Neil' Knobel (29 November 1936 – 22 July 2021) was a South African military commander. A medical doctor, he was Surgeon-General, in command of the South African Medical Service, from 1988 to 1997.

== Medical career ==
Knobel was born in Edinburgh, Scotland in 1936. Educated at the Afrikaans Boys High School in Pretoria, South Africa, he graduated with an MD and as specialist anatomist at the University of Edinburgh in Scotland in 1966. After being involved in academic medicine as a teacher of anatomy to approximately 20,000 students of all health professions in both Scotland and South Africa, he retired as Professor and Head of the Anatomy Department at the University of Pretoria, South Africa in 1979.

Having served for 13 years (from 1966 to 1979) as a Medical Officer, in various staff and operational positions in the part-time forces of the South African Defence Force, he joined the Permanent Force as Chief of Staff Medical Operations, with the rank of Brigadier in 1980. During the period 1980 to 1988, he obtained the Command and Staff and Joint Staff qualifications of the SADF, and served in various capacities in numerous operations in the RSA, South West Africa, Angola and Mozambique. In 1988 he was appointed Surgeon General of the SADF with the rank of lieutenant general.

During his term of office he was responsible for the medical care of four successive State Presidents of the RSA, all foreign dignitaries, as well as providing a specialized supporting service to all the security services and the Department of Health in South Africa. He also commanded the secretive South African chemical and biological weapons program, known as Project Coast from 1988 to 1998.

== Honours and awards ==
He officially visited 160 military and scientific installations in 14 countries, received 21 honours and awards and was decorated on seven occasions. In particular the Order of the Star of South Africa (Silver) was conferred on him by the State President of the RSA in 1992 and in 1994, Queen Elizabeth II sanctioned his promotion to Knight of the Order of St John.

=== Medal List ===
- Star of South Africa (Silver) (SSAS)
- Southern Cross Decoration (SD)
- South African Police Star for Outstanding Service (SOE)
- Southern Cross Medal (1975) (SM)
- Military Merit Medal (MMM)
- Pro Patria Medal
- Southern Africa Medal
- General Service Medal (South Africa)
- Unitas (Unity) Medal
- Good Service Medal (Silver (20 Years))
- Good Service Medal (Bronze (10 Years))
- Venerable Order of Saint John (Gr II - Knight of Justice or Grace) (KStJ)

== Professional recognition ==
He is the author/co-author of 72 academic, military and/or scientific publications and is associated with 45 professional societies/organizations. With a special devotion to the needs of the disabled, he established the Curamus Association and Curamus Monument, for serving and ex-serving members of the Security Services of the RSA in 1989 and was awarded the World Veterans Fund Rehabilitation Prize for his work in this regard in 2000.

== See also ==
- List of South African military chiefs
- South African Medical Service

Military offices
Preceded by Nicolaas Nieuwoudt	Chief of the South African Military Health Service; 1988 – 1997	Succeeded by Davidson Masuku
Unknown	Deputy Chief of Staff Operations; 1987 – 1988	Succeeded by James Kriel
Unknown	Chief of Medical Staff Operations; 1983 – 1986	Succeeded by Charles Frederick Scheepers
