= Barend Viljoen =

South African air force general

Major General Benjamin Gottlieb Viljoen SSA OBE
- Born: 13 April 1908
- Died: 1995 (aged 86–87)
- Military career
- Allegiance: South Africa
- Branch: South African Air Force
- Service years: 1927–1965
- Rank: Major General
- Nickname: Barend
- Commands: Air Force Chief of Staff
- Wars: World War II
- Awards

Major-General Benjamin Gottlieb "Barend" Viljoen SSA OBE (13 April 1908 – 1995) was a South African military commander.

== Military career ==
He joined the South African Air Force in 1927, and served in World War II. He also served as ADC to the Governor General of the Union of South Africa and to the King of Greece. He was Air Chief of Staff from 23 September 1956 to 30 April 1965.

== Honours and awards ==
He was awarded the Order of the British Empire in 1944.

- Star of South Africa (1952) (SSA)
- Order of the British Empire (OBE)

== See also ==
- List of South African military chiefs
- South African Air Force

Military offices
Preceded by Stephen Melville	Chief of Staff of the South African Air Force; 23 September 1956–30 April 1965	Succeeded by Kalfie Martin
