= Pieter Grobbelaar =

South African Army general (1908–1988)

General Pieter Hendrik Grobbelaar SSA DSO
- Born: 16 September 1908; Porterville, Cape Colony
- Died: 22 June 1988 (aged 79)
- Military career
- Allegiance: South Africa
- Branch: South African Army
- Service years: 1933–1965
- Rank: General
- Commands: Commandant General of the South African Defence Force; Army Chief of Staff; South African Military College; Northern Transvaal Command; Orange Free State Command; 7th Reconnaissance Battalion
- Wars: Second World War
- Awards

General Pieter Grobbelaar, SSA DSO (16 September 1908 – 22 June 1988) was a South African military commander. He served as Army Chief of Staff from 1953 to 1958, and Commandant General of the South African Defence Force from 1961 to 1965.

== Military career ==
Grobbelaar joined the South African Army as a part-time Citizen Force soldier in 1929 and became a full-time Permanent Force member in 1933.

During the Second World War, Grobbelaar commanded the 7th Reconnaissance Battalion as a lieutenant colonel, and was second-in-command of the 12th Motorised Brigade, 6th Armoured Division during the Italy.

After the war, Grobbelaar served as Officer Commanding Orange Free State Command, Northern Transvaal Command and the South African Military College.

Grobbelaar served as Army Chief of Staff from 1953 to 1958, as Inspector-General from 1958 to 1959, as Deputy Commandant-General from 1959 to 1960, and as Commandant General of the South African Defence Force from 1961 to 1965.

== Awards and decorations ==
- Star of South Africa (1952) (SSA)
- Queen Elizabeth II Coronation Medal
- Union Medal
- Distinguished Service Order (DSO)
- 1939–45 Star
- Africa Star
- Italy Star
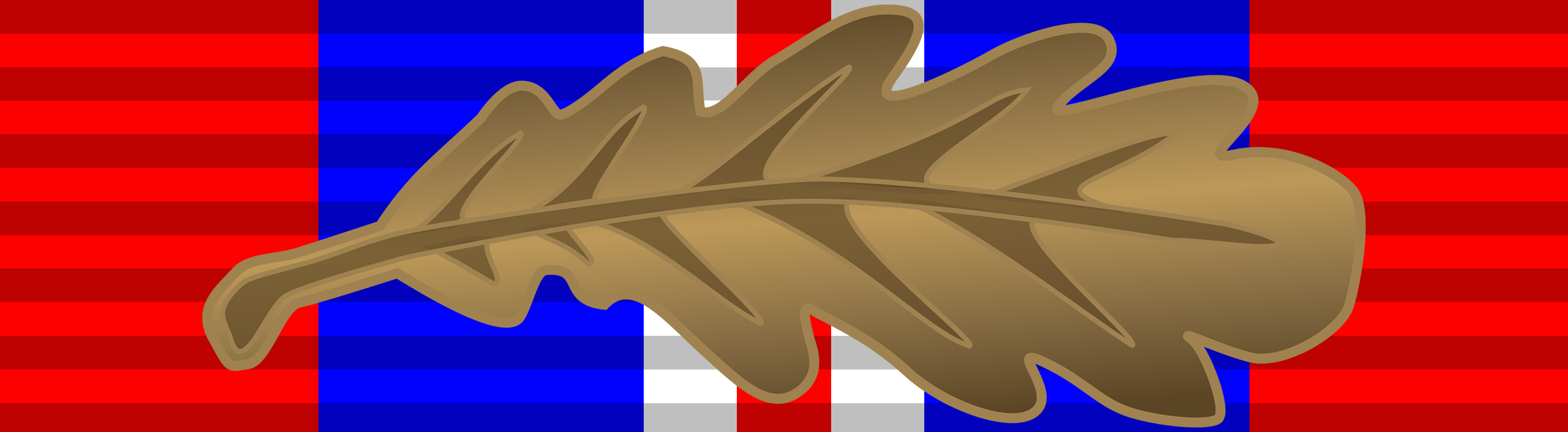
- War Medal 1939 – 1945 (Mentioned in Dispatches) (MID)
- Defence Medal (United Kingdom)
- Africa Service Medal (WWII)

Military offices
Preceded by Stephen Melville	Commandant General of the South African Defence Force; 1961–1965	Succeeded by Rudolph Hiemstra
Preceded by Hendrik Klopper	Army Chief of Staff; 1953–1958	Succeeded by Nick Bierman
Preceded by Harry Cilliers	Commandant South African Military College; 1950–1952	Succeeded by Petrus Jacobs
