= Fritz Loots =

Major General Frederich Wilhelm Loots SSA SD SM
- Born: 29 April 1917; Britstown, Cape Province, Union of South Africa
- Died: 12 August 2008 (aged 91) Pretoria
- Allegiance: South Africa
- Branch: South African Army
- Service years: 1939–1982
- Rank: Major General
- Commands: GOC South West Africa Command (1963–1964); Director of Military Intelligence (1966–1970); Inspector General of the SADF (1970–1973); GOC Special Forces (1974–1982)
- Conflicts: Second World War Border War
- Awards

Major General Frederich ('Fritz') Wilhelm Loots SSA SD SM (1917 – 2008) was a general in the South African Defence Force (SADF). He was founder of the South African Special Forces and their first commanding officer.

== Early life and education ==
Born in Britstown on 26 April 1917, Loots was educated at Theron High School. After high school in 1936, he joined the Special Service Battalion, a unit formed to train young men in military and work skills during the depression.

== Career ==
In 1939, he joined the Union Defence Force in the Infantry Corps and served in World War II. By 1947 he held the rank of Warrant Officer and in 1951 he was commissioned as an officer. He held various positions as a Staff Officer in the SADF before becoming Officer Commanding the Army Gymnasium from 1959 to 1963.

In 1963, he was appointed to command South West Africa Command until 1964. By 1965 he was a Senior Staff Officer at Military Intelligence and then the Director of Military Intelligence from 1966 until 1970. His last position was as Inspector General of the SADF which ended in June 1973 when he retired.

He returned from retirement in August 1974 to found the South African Special Forces. In 1980 Loots led Operation Winter, which was undertaken to recruit former members of the Rhodesian Security Forces to serve with South Africa. He continued in the SADF until his retirement on 25 April 1982. Major General Loots died on 12 August 2008.

== Awards and decorations ==
- Star of South Africa (1952) (SSA)
- Southern Cross Decoration (SD)
- Southern Cross Medal (1952) (SM)
- Good Service Medal (Gold (30 Years))
- Good Service Medal (Silver (20 Years))
- Union Medal
- 1939–45 Star
- Africa Star
- Italy Star
- War Medal 1939–1945
- Africa Service Medal (WWII)

Military offices
New title Post Established	GOC Special Forces; 1974–1982	Succeeded by Maj Gen Andreas Liebenberg
Preceded by Maj Gen Boet Stapelberg as Director General Army Operations & Training	Inspector General SADF; 1971–1973	Succeeded by Lt Gen Willem Louw
Preceded by Brig Pieter M Retief	DG Military Intelligence; 1966–1970	Succeeded by Maj Gen Hein du Toit
Preceded by PE Ferguson	GOC South West Africa Command; 1963–1964	Succeeded by Chockie Coetser
Unknown	OC South African Army Gymnasium; 1959–1963	Unknown
