= Stephen Melville =

South African Air Force officer (1904–1977)

General Stephen Alexander Melville SSA OBE
- Born: 31 December 1904; Matatiele, Natal
- Died: 17 June 1977 (aged 72); Pretoria, South Africa
- Spouse: Ursula Magdalene Strijdom
- Relatives: J.G. Strijdom (brother in law)
- Military career
- Allegiance: South Africa
- Branch: South African Air Force
- Service years: 1924–1960
- Rank: General
- Commands: Commandant General of the South African Defence Force; Air Chief of Staff
- Conflicts: Second World War; East African Campaign; Battle of Madagascar; Italian Campaign
- Awards
- Other work: Armaments Board of South Africa

General Stephen Alexander Melville SSA OBE (31 December 1904 – 17 June 1977) was a South African Air Force officer. He commanded air force formations in East Africa, North Africa, Madagascar, and Italy during the Second World War, and rose to Air Chief of Staff (1954–56) and Commandant General of the South African Defence Force (1958–60).

== Early life ==
Melville was born in Matatiele, Natal, on 31 December 1904, and was educated at Grey College, Bloemfontein. He then worked in a bank, and later joined the Merchant Navy as a stoker. He joined the South African Mounted Rifles in 1924 as a trooper before transferring to the Artillery. In 1929, after a short boxing career in South Africa and the United States, Melville was trained as a pilot and transferred to the South African Air Force.

== Air Force career ==
Melville commanded air force formations in the East African Campaign, Battle of Madagascar and Italian Campaign during the Second World War. For his service, Melville was appointed an Officer of the Order of the British Empire, and Mentioned in Despatches in July 1943.

Melville served as Air Chief of Staff from 1954 to 1956, as Inspector-General from 1956 to 1958, and as Commandant General, the head of the Union Defence Force, from 1958 to 1960. He was awarded the Star of South Africa in June 1960.

Melville later served on the Armaments Board until 1974. He was also the Government's representative on the Rand Water Board.

== Awards and decorations ==
- Star of South Africa (1952) (SSA)
- Queen Elizabeth II Coronation Medal
- Union Medal
- Order of the British Empire (OBE)
- 1939–45 Star
- Africa Star (NORTH AFRICA 1942–43 clasp)
- Italy Star
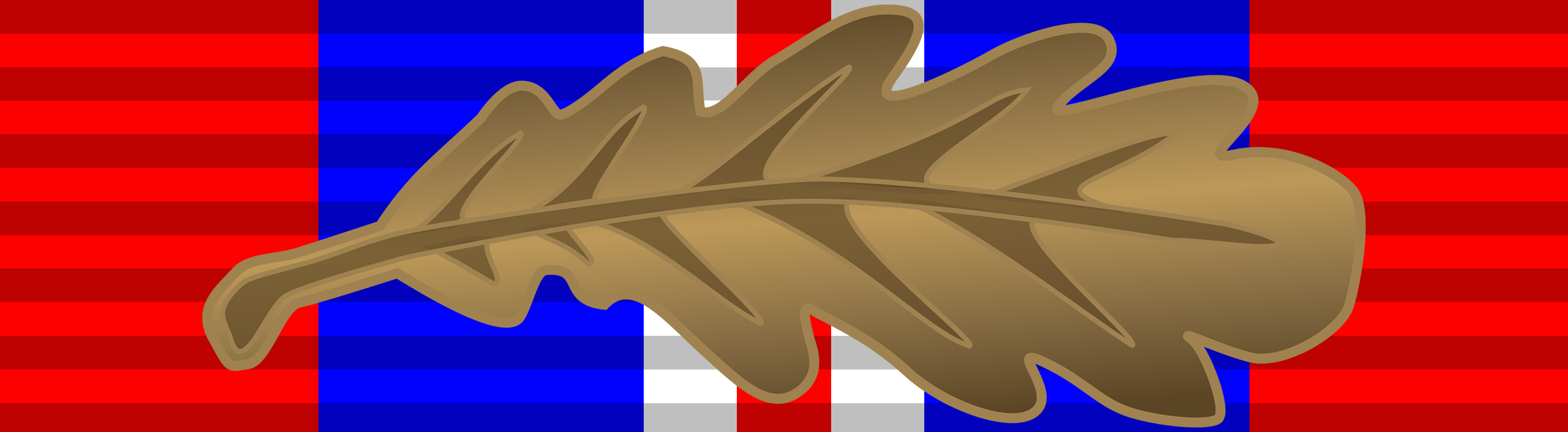
- War Medal 1939 – 1945 (Mentioned in Dispatches) (MID)
- Africa Service Medal (WWII)
- Order of St. Anne with Swords (Russia)

Military offices
Preceded by Hendrik Klopper	Commandant General of the South African Defence Force; 1958–1960	Succeeded by Pieter Grobbelaar
Preceded by Hendrik Klopper	Inspector General South African National Defence Force; 1956–1958	Succeeded by Pieter Grobbelaar
Preceded by Harold Willmott	Air Chief of Staff; 1954–1956	Succeeded by Barend Viljoen
