= Georg Meiring =

South African military commander (1939–2024)

General Georg Lodewyk Meiring SSA SD SM MMM
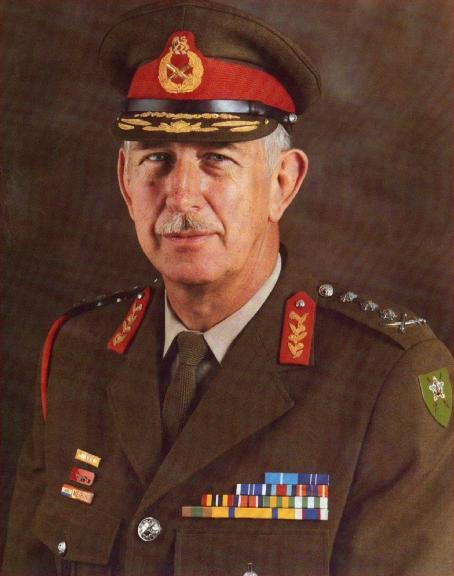
- Born: 18 October 1939; Ladybrand, Orange Free State Province, Union of South Africa
- Died: 3 September 2024 (aged 84); Pretoria, South Africa
- Military career
- Allegiance: South Africa
- Branch: South African Army
- Service years: 1962–1998
- Rank: General
- Commands: Chief of the South African National Defence Force (1993–98); Chief of the Army (1990–93); Far North Command (1987–89); South West African Territorial Force (1983–87)
- Conflicts: South African Border War
- Awards

General Georg Lodewyk Meiring SSA SD SM MMM (18 October 1939 – 3 September 2024) was a South African military commander. He served as Chief of the Army (1990–93) and Chief of the South African National Defence Force (1993–98).

== Background ==
Georg Meiring was born in Ladybrand, Orange Free State Province, Union of South Africa on 18 October 1939. He obtained a Master of Science in Physics from the University of the Orange Free State.

Meiring died in Pretoria on 3 September 2024, at the age of 84.

== Military career ==
Meiring joined the South African Army as a signals officer in 1962 and, in 1980, became Director of Signals of the South African Army.

Meiring served as Deputy Chief of the Army from 1982 to 1983 and as General Officer Commanding (GOC) South West Africa Territorial Force from 1983 to 1987. He was later GOC Far North Command, Deputy Chief of the Army again, Chief of the Army from 1990 to 1993, the last Chief of the South African Defence Force from 1993 to 1994, and the first Chief of the South African National Defence Force from 1994 to 1998.

== Controversy ==
In February 1998, Meiring, in his capacity as the head of defence of South Africa had provided an intelligence report to President Nelson Mandela on an organisation by the name of "Front African People's Liberation Army". This report implicated many important government dignitaries on conspiracy to assassinate the president, murder judges, occupy parliament and broadcasting stations and cause mayhem in general. Later, after it was investigated by a judge, the report was claimed to be fabricated.

== Awards and decorations ==
61 Mech Operational Service Badge (Service)
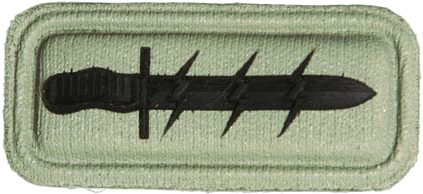
Black on Thatch beige, Embossed. Rectangular bar (upright) with a black dagger and three black lightning flashes angled diagonally across the blade

In 1998, Meiring was awarded the Star of South Africa, Gold. He also received the Order of the Cloud and Banner 4th class from Taiwan.

- Star of South Africa (Gold) (SSAG)
- Southern Cross Decoration (SD)
- Southern Cross Medal (1975) (SM)
- Military Merit Medal (MMM)
- Pro Patria Medal
- Southern Africa Medal
- General Service Medal (South Africa)
- Unitas (Unity) Medal
- Good Service Medal (Gold (30 Years))
- Good Service Medal (Silver (20 Years))
- Good Service Medal (Bronze (10 Years))
- Order of the Cloud and Banner (2^{nd} Grade - with Grand Cordon) (ORB)
- Order of the Cloud and Banner (3^{rd} Grade - with Yellow Grand Cordon) (ORB)
- Order of the Cloud and Banner (4^{th} Grade - with Special Cravat) (ORB)
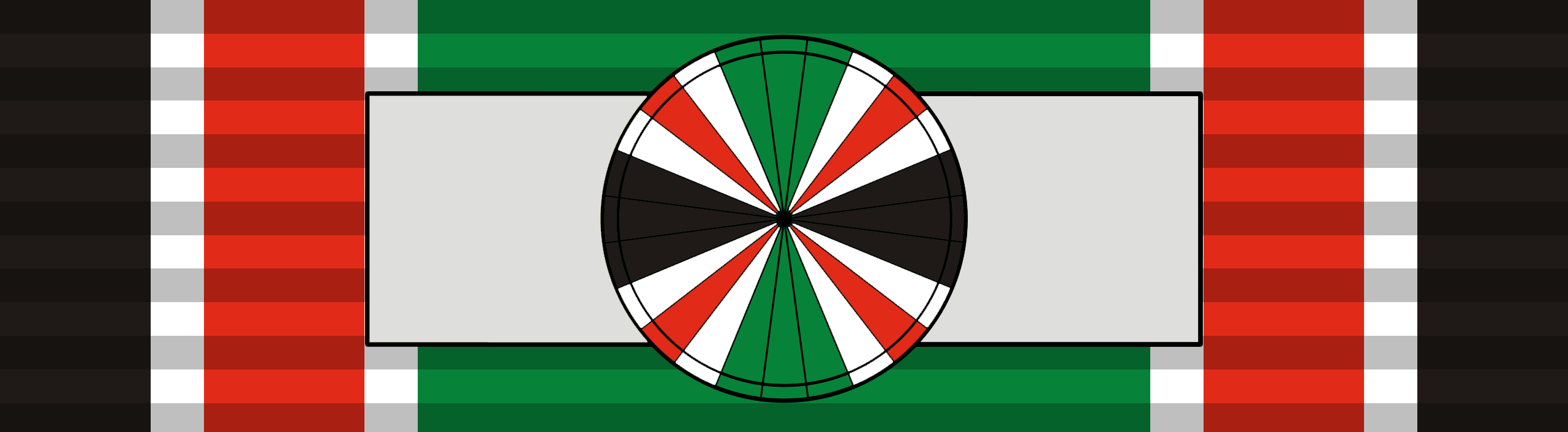
- Commander of the Order of Military Merit (Jordan)

Military offices
New title Retitled from Chief of the South African Defence Force	Chief of the South African National Defence Force; 1994–1998	Succeeded by Siphiwe Nyanda
Preceded by Andreas Liebenberg	Chief of the South African Defence Force; 1993–1994	Renamed Chief of the South African National Defence Force
Preceded by Andreas Liebenberg	Chief of the Army; 1990–1993	Succeeded by Hattingh Pretorius
Preceded by Len Meyer	Deputy Chief of the South African Army; 1989–1990	Succeeded by Daan Hamman
Preceded by Charles Lloyd	GOC Far North Command; 1987–1989	Succeeded by Willie Meyer
Preceded by Charles Lloyd	GOC South West Africa Territorial Force; 1983–1987	Succeeded by Willie Meyer
