= Wiseman Mbambo =

South African Air Force officer

Lieutenant General Wiseman Simo Mbambo psc(j)
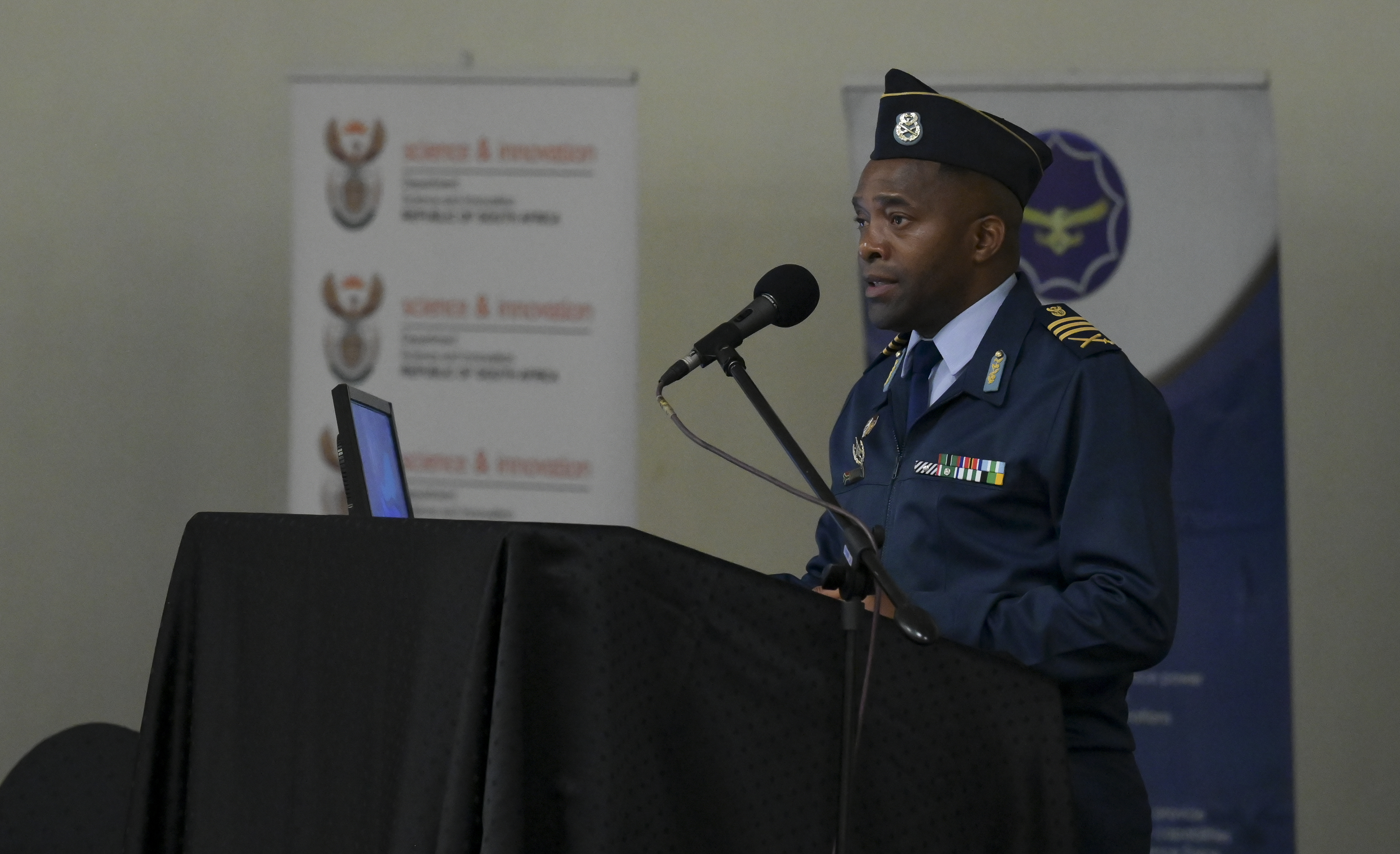
- Born: March 15, 1966 (age 60); Louwsburg, Natal
- Military career
- Allegiance: South Africa
- Branch: South African Air Force
- Service years: 1994–
- Rank: Lieutenant General
- Commands: Chief of the South African Air Force; SANDF Deputy Chief of Staff; GOC Air Command
- Awards: Operational Medal for Southern Africa South Africa Service Medal Tshumelo Ikatelaho (General Service Medal) Unitas (Unity) Medal Medalje vir Troue Diens (Medal for Loyal Service) Good Service Medal Service Medal

Wiseman Mbambo psc(j) (born 15 March 1966) is a South African Air Force officer, serving as Chief of the South African Air Force.

He joined the ANC's military wing, uMkhonto we Sizwe at 17 years and received his military training in Angola and Soviet Union. He served in exile as training instructor. General Mbambo was attested into the SANDF in 1994 as a Major.

Mbambo was appointed Officer Commanding Waterkloof Air Force Base in 2004 before being appointed as Director: Air Force Capability and Plans in 2009. In 2013 he was promoted Major General and appointed GOC Air Command.

== Academic qualifications ==
- Master of Business Leadership (Strategic and Operations ) from University of South Africa -South Africa, 2022
- BA Mil Science from Frunze – USSR, 1991
- Master's Degree in Strategic Security Studies from the Air University at Maxwell Air Force Base in Montgomery, Alabama in the United States of America, 2004
- Diploma in Ministry Studies from Faith International Bible College Lenasia, 2008
- Diploma in Aviation Safety Management Systems from the University of Southern California, 2012

== Awards and decorations ==
- Operational Medal for Southern Africa
- South Africa Service Medal
- Tshumelo Ikatelaho (General Service Medal) (Humanitarian Aid clasp)
- Unitas (Unity) Medal
- Medalje vir Troue Diens (Medal for Loyal Service) (30 Year Clasp)
- Good Service Medal (Silver (20 Years))
- Service Medal (Bronze)

Military offices
Preceded by Fabian Msimang	Chief of the South African Air Force; 2021–present	Incumbent
Preceded by Louis Dlulane	Deputy Chief of Staff SANDF; 2017–2021	Succeeded by Bonginkosi Ncqobo
Unknown	GOC Air Command; 2013–2017	Succeeded by Octavia Mcetywa
