= Fabian Msimang =

South African Air Force officer

Lieutenant General Fabian Zimpande Msimang
- Born: 1 September 1960 (age 66); Johannesburg, South Africa
- Spouse: Afrika Msimang (wife)
- Relatives: Mendi Msimang (father)
- Military career
- Allegiance: South Africa
- Branch: South African Air Force
- Rank: Lieutenant General
- Nickname: "Zakes"
- Commands: Chief of the South African Air Force; Chief Director Air Policy and Plans; Director Helicopter Systems; OC Air Force Base Bloemspruit; OC Helicopter Flying School
- Awards: Operational Medal for Southern Africa South Africa Service Medal Tshumelo Ikatelaho (General Service Medal) Unitas (Unity) Medal Medalje vir Troue Diens (Medal for Loyal Service) Good Service Medal Order of Military Merit

Fabian Zimpande "Zakes" Msimang (born 1 September 1960) is a retired South African Air Force officer who served as the Chief of the South African Air Force.

He left South Africa with his family at the age of 6 months and went into exile. He completed his secondary schooling in India. In 1983 he was sent to Tanzania to assist with the opening of the ANC Development Centre.

== Career ==
He received his flying training at Frunze 1 Central Officers Training Center (now the Military Institute of the Armed Forces of the Kyrgyz Republic) – Kirghiz SSR, in the Soviet Union from 1986 to 1991. He graduated from the institution with a diploma in Command & Tactics of Military Aviation.

He has been a member of the uMkhonto weSizwe (MK), the military wing of the African National Congress and saw combat in Angola in 1986. In 1994, he completed the Air Force Junior Staff Course in Zimbabwe before integrating into the South African National Defence Force.

He was appointed assistant project officer on Project Flange (the acquisition programme of the Agusta A109) in Italy where he also completed the Senior Staff Course at the Italian Air Force War School. On his return from Italy, Msimang was then appointed Officer Commanding of the Helicopter Flying School at Air Force Base Bloemspruit.

In 2005, he was appointed officer commanding Air Force Base Bloemspruit and promoted to the rank of colonel. In 2006, he completed the Executive National Security Programme at the South African National Defence College. In June 2007, after a two-and-a-half-year tour as officer commanding Air Force Base Bloemspruit, he was appointed director of helicopter systems and promoted to the rank of brigadier general at the Air Command.

In November 2010, he was appointed chief director of air policy and plans and promoted to the rank of major general responsible for Air Force strategy, policies, capabilities and resource allocation.

Msimang became the Chief of the Air Force on 1 October 2012. He retired at the end of September 2020.

== Aircraft flown ==
- Alouette III
- Atlas Oryx
- Mi-8
- Mi-24

== Awards and decorations ==
The following have been awarded to Msimang:

- Operational Medal for Southern Africa
- South Africa Service Medal
- Tshumelo Ikatelaho (General Service Medal)
- Unitas (Unity) Medal
- Medalje vir Troue Diens (Medal for Loyal Service) (20 Year Clasp)
- Good Service Medal (Bronze (10 Years))
- Order of Military Merit (Commander - Comendador) (Brazil)

=== Proficiency awards ===
Pilots Wings (Qualification)
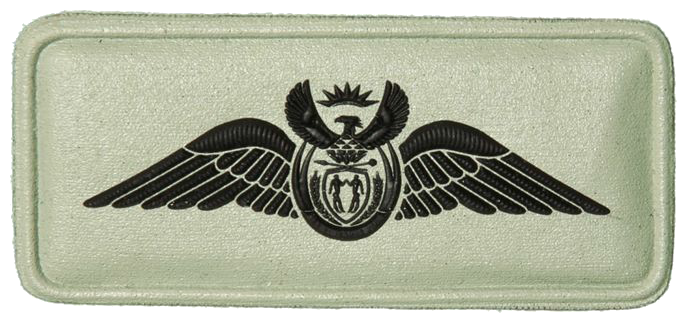
0-500 hrs. Black on Thatch beige, Embossed. National Coat of Arms with large wings

Military offices
Preceded by Carlo Gagiano	Chief of the South African Air Force; 2012–2020	Succeeded by Wiseman Mbambo
Preceded by Lucky Ngema	Chief Director Air Policy & Plans SAAF; 2010–2012	Succeeded by Cedric Masters
Preceded by RC Johnson	OC AFB Bloemspruit; 2005–2006	Succeeded by H Treunicht
Preceded by Johnny Laing	OC 87 Helicopter Flying School SAAF; 2004–2005	Unknown
