= Star of South Africa (1952) =

Former South African military decoration

- Type: Military decoration for merit
- Awarded for: Exceptionally meritorious service
- Country: South Africa
- Presented by: Queen of South Africa until 1961; State President from 1961
- Eligibility: General and flag officers
- Post-nominals: SSA
- Status: Discontinued in 1975
- Established: 1952
- First award: 1960
- Final award: 1975

Highlights
- Total: 20
- Ribbon bar

SADF pre-1994 & SANDF post-2002 orders of wear
- Next (higher): SADF precedence: Star of South Africa, Silver; SANDF precedence: Order of the Leopard, Military Division, Commander
- Next (lower): SADF succession: Louw Wepener Decoration; SANDF succession: Louw Wepener Decoration

The Star of South Africa, post-nominal letters SSA, is a military decoration for merit which was instituted by the Union of South Africa from 1952 to 1975. It was awarded to general and flag officers of the South African Defence Force for exceptionally meritorious service. The Star of South Africa was discontinued on 1 July 1975, when a new set of orders, decorations and medals was instituted.

== The South African military ==
The Union Defence Forces (UDF) were established in 1912, and renamed the South African Defence Force (SADF) in 1958. On 27 April 1994, it was integrated with six other independent forces into the South African National Defence Force (SANDF).

== Institution ==
The Star of South Africa, post-nominal letters SSA, was introduced by Queen Elizabeth II on 6 April 1952, during the Tercentenary Van Riebeeck Festival. It was formally instituted by the Queen on 26 January 1953.

The decoration was named after the first large diamond to be found in South Africa, the Star of South Africa, which was found on the banks of the Orange River in 1869, which sparked the New Rush, leading to the establishment of Kimberley, the capital and largest city of Northern Cape Province in South Africa

== Award criteria ==
The Star of South Africa was awarded to general and flag officers for exceptionally meritorious service. In effect, it took the place of the Commander of the Order of the British Empire (CBE), which had been awarded to senior South African officers during World War II.

== Order of wear ==
With effect from 6 April 1952, when the Star of South Africa and several other new decorations and medals were instituted, these new awards took precedence before all earlier British decorations and medals awarded to South Africans, with the exception of the Victoria Cross, which still took precedence before all other awards. The other older British awards continued to be worn in the order prescribed by the British Central Chancery of the Orders of Knighthood.

The position of the Star of South Africa in the official order of precedence was revised three times after 1975, to accommodate the inclusion or institution of new decorations and medals, upon the integration into the South African National Defence Force in 1994, when decorations and medals were belatedly instituted in April 1996 for the two former non-statutory forces, the Azanian People's Liberation Army and Umkhonto we Sizwe, and again when a new series of military decorations and medals was instituted in South Africa on 27 April 2003.

South African Defence Force until 26 April 1994

- Official SADF order of precedence:
  - Preceded by the Star of South Africa, Silver (SSAS).
  - Succeeded by the Louw Wepener Decoration (LWD).
- Official national order of precedence:
  - Preceded by the Order of Good Hope Class III, Commander.
  - Succeeded by the Decoration for Meritorious Service (DMS).

South African National Defence Force from 27 April 1994

- Official SANDF order of precedence:
  - Preceded by the Order of the Leopard, Military Division, Commander of the Republic of Bophuthatswana.
  - Succeeded by the Louw Wepener Decoration (LWD) of the Republic of South Africa.
- Official national order of precedence:
  - Preceded by the Order of Good Hope Class III, Commander of the Republic of South Africa.
  - Succeeded by the Decoration for Meritorious Service (DMS) of the Republic of South Africa.

South African National Defence Force from 27 April 2003

- Official SANDF order of precedence:
  - Preceded by the Order of the Leopard, Military Division, Commander of the Republic of Bophuthatswana.
  - Succeeded by the Louw Wepener Decoration (LWD) of the Republic of South Africa.
- Official national order of precedence:
  - Preceded by the Companion of O.R. Tambo, Bronze of the Republic of South Africa.
  - Succeeded by the Decoration for Meritorious Service (DMS) of the Republic of South Africa.

== Description ==
Obverse

The Star of South Africa was struck in silver and consists of eight five-pointed stars of differing sizes, superimposed on each other, to fit into a 50 millimetres diameter circle.

Reverse

The reverse has the pre-1994 South African coat of arms. Specimens which were minted and awarded before South Africa became a republic on 31 May 1961, have Queen Elizabeth's royal cipher (E II R) above the coat of arms.

Ribbon

The decoration is worn around the neck on an orange ribbon, 44 millimetres wide, with three green bands in the centre, all 3 millimetres wide and spaced 6 millimetres apart.

== Discontinuation ==
Conferment of the decoration was discontinued in respect of services performed on or after 1 July 1975, when the Order of the Star of South Africa was instituted.

In 1977, recipients of the Star of South Africa of 1952 were promoted to the new Order of the Star of South Africa, by being presented with the Star of South Africa, Gold in substitution of their existing decorations.

One documented example is Lieutenant General Colin Cockcroft SSA SM, whose 1952 decoration (no. 38) was replaced by the Star of South Africa, Gold (no. 5) on 15 April 1977.

Another example is General Magnus Malan SSA SD OMSG SM MP, whose photograph alongside shows him wearing the Star of South Africa, Gold around his neck as well as the miniature on his chest, while the main picture at the top of this page shows the Star of South Africa of 1952 named to him.

== Recipients ==
Name	Rank	Service Arm	Appointment	Date awarded
Melville, S.A.	Cmdt Gen	SAAF	Commandant General SADF	13 May 1960
Grobbelaar, P.H.	Maj Gen	SA Army	Deputy Commandant General	13 May 1960
Hiemstra, R.C.	Maj Gen	SAAF	Inspector General SADF	13 May 1960
Viljoen, B.G.	Maj Gen	SAAF	Air Chief of Staff	13 May 1960
Biermann, H.H.	R Adm	SAN	Naval Chief of Staff	13 May 1960
Bierman, J.N.	Maj Gen	SA Army	Director of Planning & Operations	14 May 1965
Jacobs, P.J.	Maj Gen	SA Army	Army Chief of Staff	14 May 1965
Hartzenberg, C.H.	Maj Gen	SAAF	Chief of Defence Force Administration	16 Jun 1967
Fraser, C.A.	Lt Gen	SA Army	General Officer Commanding, Joint Combat Forces	13 Jun 1969
Laubscher, P.H.	Maj Gen	SA Army	Deputy Chief of Defence Staff (Administration)	13 Jun 1969
Loots, F.W.	Maj Gen	SA Army	Director General Military Intelligence	13 Jun 1969
Raymond, E.C.	Maj Gen	SAMS	Surgeon General	13 Jun 1969
Van der Riet, W.R.	Lt Gen	SA Army	Chief of Defence Staff	25 May 1973
Terry-Lloyd, M.R.	R Adm	SAN	SA Armed Forces Attaché to the UK	25 May 1973
Cockcroft, Colin Royden, SM	Lt Gen	SAMS	Surgeon General	28 Jun 1974
Louw, W.P.	Lt Gen	SA Army	Inspector General SADF	28 Jun 1974
Verster, J.P.	Lt Gen	SAAF	Chief of the Air Force	28 Jun 1974
Armstrong, R.F.	Lt Gen	SAAF	Chief of Defence Staff	6 Jun 1975
Malan, M.A.d.M.	Lt Gen	SA Army	Chief of the Army	6 Jun 1975
Johnson, J.	V Adm	SAN	Chief of the Navy	6 Jun 1975
