= Derek Christian =

South African Navy officer

Rear Admiral Derek John Christian MMM LOM (USA)
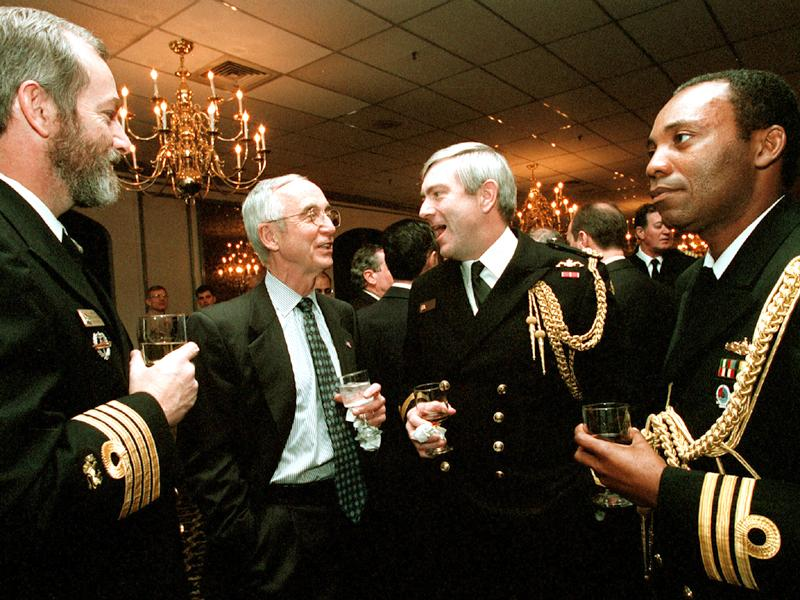
- Christian (left) in 2001
- Military career
- Allegiance: South Africa
- Branch: South African Navy
- Service years: 1975–date
- Rank: Rear Admiral
- Commands: Deputy Chief Joint Operations Division; South African Military Academy
- Awards: Military Merit Medal MMM Pro Patria Medal Southern Africa Medal General Service Medal (South Africa) Unitas (Unity) Medal Medalje vir Troue Diens (Medal for Loyal Service) Good Service Medal Legion of Merit LOM Tamandaré Medal of Merit

Rear Admiral Derek Christian MMM LOM (USA) is a retired South African Navy officer. His last appointment was Deputy Chief of Joint Operations Division of the South African National Defence Force, during which he was the Acting Chief of the Division for seven months. He retired from the Navy in February 2017.

== Military career ==
After completing school at Grey High School in Port Elizabeth, he joined the Navy in 1975. He completed a BMil degree at the Military Academy and then joined the Strike Craft flotilla before volunteering for submarines in 1980.

He attended the US Naval War College from 1996 to 1997. After returning to South Africa, he was appointed to Naval Headquarters as Senior Staff Officer Maritime Strategy. He was the Naval Attaché in Washington, DC, from December 2000 to June 2003, before being appointed to the South African National Defence College, Pretoria, on his return from Washington.

He became the 17th Commandant of the South African Military Academy in 2006 and was promoted to Rear Admiral (Junior Grade) in May 2006. In April 2009, he was posted to Naval Headquarters as Director Special Projects, and assumed the post of Director Naval Logistics in 2011, the first non-logistician to be appointed into this post.

He was appointed Deputy Chief of Joint Operations in April 2016 and appointed as the Acting Chief of Joint Operations in June 2016. He retired on 28 February 2017.

== Honours and awards ==
He completed an MBA at the University of Cape Town as well as an MA in International Relations from Salve Regina University. His medals include the Military Merit Medal and the Legion of Merit from the United States as well as the Tamandare Medal of Merit from the Brazilian Navy.

=== List ===
- Military Merit Medal (MMM)
- Pro Patria Medal
- Southern Africa Medal
- General Service Medal (South Africa)
- Unitas (Unity) Medal
- Medalje vir Troue Diens (Medal for Loyal Service) (30 Year Clasp)
- Good Service Medal (Silver (20 Years))
- Good Service Medal (Bronze (10 Years))
- Legion of Merit (Officer) (LOM) (USA)
- Tamandaré Medal of Merit (Note: Portuguese: Medalha do Mérito Tamandaré) (Brazil)

== Notes ==
Military offices
Preceded by Duma Mdutyana	Acting CJ Ops; 2016-2017	Succeeded by Barney Hlatswayo
Preceded by Mbulelo Phako	Deputy CJ Ops; 2016-2017	Succeeded by Eddie Drost
Preceded by Tawana Manyama	Commandant of the Military Academy; 2006-2009	Succeeded by Lindile Yam
