= Themba =

Themba (Nomathemba female) is a South African name meaning faith. This term is often used in a Godly manner. In the Christian bible for an example, the Lord of Lords Christ Jesus used to use this term for someone who had an exceptional way of speaking and doing for the Glory of God. Notable people with the name include:

Given or middle name

- Themba Dlamini (born 1950), Prime Minister of Swaziland
- Themba Godi (born 1966), South African politician
- Themba Mabaso, director of South Africa Bureau of Heraldry
- Themba Maseko (born 1961), South African politician
- Themba N. Masuku, regional administrator of Swaziland
- Themba Matanzima, South African Army officer
- Themba Mnguni (born 1973), South African football player
- Themba Muata-Marlow (born 1994), Australian/English football defender of Jamaican ancestry
- Themba Ndaba, South African Actor and director
- Themba Ndlovu, Zimbabwean football defender
- Themba Nkabinde, South African Army General Officer
- Themba Nkozi, South African techno and house music DJ and producer
- Alfred Themba Qabula (1942–2002), South African poet, writer and trade unionist
- Themba Sukude (born 1974), South African serial killer
- Themba Vilakazi (born 1981–1982), South African serial killer
- Themba Zwane (born 1989), South African football midfielder

Surname

- Albert Themba, South African politician
- Can Themba (1924–1968), South African short-story writer

== See also ==
- The Themba Development Project, a Canadian non-profit organization
