= Les Rudman =

Major General Les Rudman PVD SD SM MMM SAStC
- Born: Leslie; 18 March 1955 (age 71)
- Spouse: Elsje Rudman
- Military career
- Allegiance: South Africa
- Branch: South African Army
- Service years: 1973–2015
- Rank: Major General
- Unit: 44 Parachute Brigade
- Commands: Deputy Chief South African Army; GOC Special Forces Brigade; OC 44 Parachute Brigade
- Conflicts: South African Border War
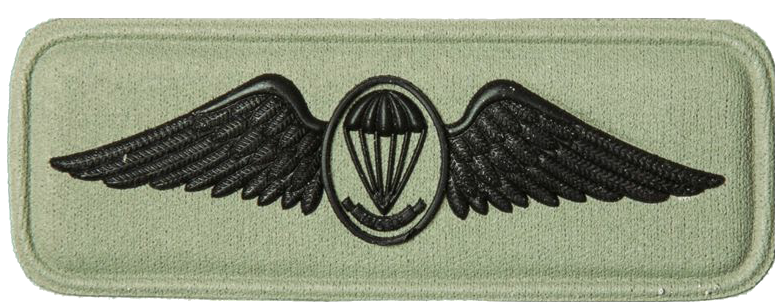
- Awards: SA Special Forces Operator's Badge Pathfinder Badge Paratrooper Instructor 61 Mech Operational Service Badge
- Other work: Security Consultant

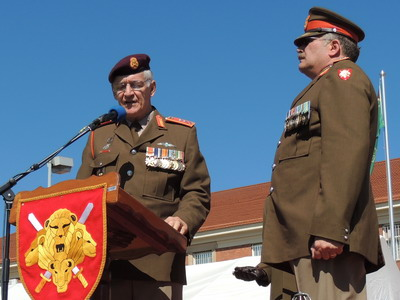

Major General Les Rudman PVD SD SM MMM SAStC was a General Officer in the South African Army from the infantry.

== Military career ==
General Rudman was an honorary Special Forces Operator, Pathfinder and parachutist instructor. He was appointed to the post of Deputy Chief of the South African Army on 1 October 2011. He was awarded the Sword of Honour at the South African Military Academy in 1976. He retired at the end of March 2015 and was succeeded by Maj Gen Lawrence Smith. He served at 31 Battalion as Company Commander, had the 32 Battalion Recce Group and some of the Pathfinders from 1 Parachute Battalion placed under his command during Operation Moduler in 1987 as part of his Liaison Team to UNITA and for this he was awarded the Pro Virtute Decoration, 1 Parachute Battalion and Brigade Commander 44 Parachute Brigade while based in Bloemfontein. He was Army attaché to Washington, DC where he was replaced by Col Chris Gildenhuys from the Armoured corps. He was appointed as Commanding General of the Special Forces Brigade reporting to Lt Gen Deon Ferreira and Lt Gen Godfrey Ngwenya, taking over from Brig Gen Borries Bornman. After this prestigious posting, he was promoted to the rank of major general as Chief Director Corporate Services in the Army Headquarters successively under Lt Gen Solly Shoke and Lt Gen Vusi Masondo. His last appointment was as Deputy Chief of the South African Army.

== Honours and awards ==
- Pro Virtute Decoration (PVD)
- Southern Cross Decoration (SD)
- Southern Cross Medal (1975) (SM)
- Military Merit Medal (MMM)
- Pro Patria Medal
- Southern Africa Medal
- General Service Medal (South Africa)
- Unitas (Unity) Medal
- Medalje vir Troue Diens (Medal for Loyal Service) (40 Year Clasp)
- Good Service Medal (Gold (30 Years))
- Good Service Medal (Silver (20 Years))
- Good Service Medal (Bronze (10 Years))
- Legion of Merit (Officer) (LOM)
- Peacemaker Medal (Brazil)

Proficiency badges
SA Special Forces Operator's Badge (Qualification) Black on Thatch beige, Embossed. Dagger enclosed with a laurel wreath (Honorary)	Pathfinder Badge (Qualification) Black on Thatch beige, Embossed.
Paratrooper Instructor (Qualification) Instructor, Static Line. Black on Thatch beige, Embossed. Large Black wings	61 Mech Operational Service Badge (Service) Black on Thatch beige, Embossed. Rectangular bar (upright) with a black dagger and three black lightning flashes angled diagonally across the blade

Military offices
Preceded by None	Deputy Chief SA Army; 2011–2015	Succeeded by Maj Gen Lawrence Smith
Preceded by Maj Gen Johann Jooste	Chief Director Corporate Services; 2006–2011	Succeeded by Maj Gen Sazi Veldtman
Preceded by Brig Borries Bornman	GOC Special Forces Brigade; 1999–2002	Succeeded by Brig Gen Krubert Nel
Preceded by Col JP Malan	Chief Instructor Staff Duties; 1997–1998	Succeeded by Col Eddie Drost
Preceded by Col McGill Alexander	OC 44 Parachute Brigade; 1 February 1992–1993	Succeeded by Col Piet Nel
