= One World One Voice =

Compilation album by various artists
- Released: 1990
- Genre: World music
- Length: 52:51
- Label: Virgin Records
- Producer: Rupert Hine

One World One Voice is a world music album intended to raise awareness of environmental issues, produced by Rupert Hine in 1990. A video of the entire album was produced for television together with a "Making of" documentary.

It was created as a “chain tape” started by Kevin Godley. The multitrack tape was sent to various studios around the world where local artists added their contributions to it. Sections of the video were also filmed in the performers' home countries and edited together. Artists participating were Afrika Bambaataa, Laurie Anderson, A Velha Guarda Da Portela, Bagamoyo Players, Cedric, The Chieftains, Clannad, Johnny Clegg & Savuka, Cy Curnin, Terence Trent D'Arby, Dred, Marc Ducret, Peter Gabriel, Bob Geldof, David Gilmour, Egberto Gismonti, Kevin Godley, Eddie Grant, The Great Muungano Cultural Troupe, Richard Galliano, The Gipsy Kings, Rupert Hine, Chrissie Hynde, Howard Jones, Salif Keita, The Kodo Drummers, Hélène Labarrière, Leningrad Symphony Orchestra (conductor Aleksandr Dmitriyev, orchestration Simon Jeffes), Ray Lema, Roger Ludvigsen, Maria McKee, Milton Nascimento, Native Land & Themba, New Frontier, New Voices of Freedom, Nu Sounds, Nusrat Fateh Ali Khan, Remmy Ongala & The Super Matimala Orchestra, Geoffrey Oryema, Hermeto Pascoal, Penguin Cafe Orchestra, Mari Boine Persen, Courtney Pine, Hossam Ramzy, Enrico Rava, Lou Reed, Robbie Robertson, Michael Rose & Junior, Ryuichi Sakamoto, Clara Sandroni, Shakespears Sister, Steve Stevens, Dave Stewart and The Spiritual Cowboys, Sting, Joe Strummer, Steven Van Zandt, Suzanne Vega, Venice, Christopher Warren-Green, Adam Woods and Guo Yue.

The album was recorded and mixed by Stephen W Tayler.

It peaked at number 27 in the UK album chart.

== Track listing ==
1. Robbie Robertson, Wayne Shorter, Egberto Gismonti, Ryuichi Sakamoto - Chief Seattle Speaks
2. Remmy Ongala & Orchestre Super Matimila, Sting, Kevin Godley, Dred, Chaz Rich, R.M.R., Steve Stevens, Ray Lema, Cedric, Courtney Pine, Hermeto Pascoal & His Band, Afrika Bambaataa, Hossam Ramzy, Rupert Hine, Cy Curnin, Adam Woods, Maria McKee, New Voices of Freedom, New Frontier - One World One Voice
3. Gipsy Kings, Nusrat Fateh Ali Khan - Este Mundo
4. Hermeto Pascoal & His Band, Laurie Anderson - (Instrumental)
5. The Chieftains, Guo Yue, Bagamogyo Players - (Irish Instrumental)
6. A Velha Guarda Da Portela - Brazilian Party
7. Peter Gabriel, Milton Nascimento, Ryuichi Sakamoto, Wayne Shorter, Egberto Gismonti, Steven van Zandt, Guo Yue - Foreplay To One Heart
8. Peter Gabriel, Steven van Zandt, Stewart Copeland, Hélène Labarrière, Geoffrey Oryema, Courtney Pine, Joe Strummer, Shakespears Sister, New York Street People - One Heart
9. Dave Stewart and The Spiritual Cowboys, Shakespears Sister, Remmy Ongala & Orchestre Super Matimila, Nusrat Fateh Ali Khan, Enrico Rava - World Music From Another World
10. Michael Rose, Junior, Steve Stevens, Rupert Hine, Stewart Copeland - One World
11. Remmy Ongala & Orchestre Super Matimila, Nusrat Fateh Ali Khan - One World
12. Geoffrey Oryema, Clannad, Peter Gabriel, Chrissie Hynde, Mari Boine, Roger Ludvigsen - Ri Na Cruinne, Gula Gula
13. Native Land & Themba, Venice - Oh Ya
14. Milton Nascimento, Bagamoyo Players - De Fira
15. Peter Gabriel, Geoffrey Oryema, Ryuichi Sakamoto, Egberto Gismonti, Stewart Copeland, Suzanne Vega - One White Field
16. Great Muungano Cultural Troup, Joe Strummer - (Drum Instrumental)
17. Lou Reed, Richard Galliano, Penguin Cafe Orchestra - One World, One Voice
18. Salif Keita, Penguin Cafe Orchestra - Nami Watah
19. Laurie Anderson, Clannad - The Whale
20. Johnny Clegg & Savuka, Eddy Grant - Long Shawah / Green World
21. Howard Jones, David Gilmour, Christopher Warren-Greene, Hossam Ramzy, Bob Geldof, Leningrad Symphony Orchestra, Terence Trent D'Arby, Venice, Clara Sandroni, Marie Boine - We Will Meet Again (Everybody's Got A Hole To Fill)(Portuguese: A gente vai se encontrar de novo)
22. The Kodo Drummers, Leningrad Symphony Orchestra - Finale
