= South African Military Academy =

Military Education

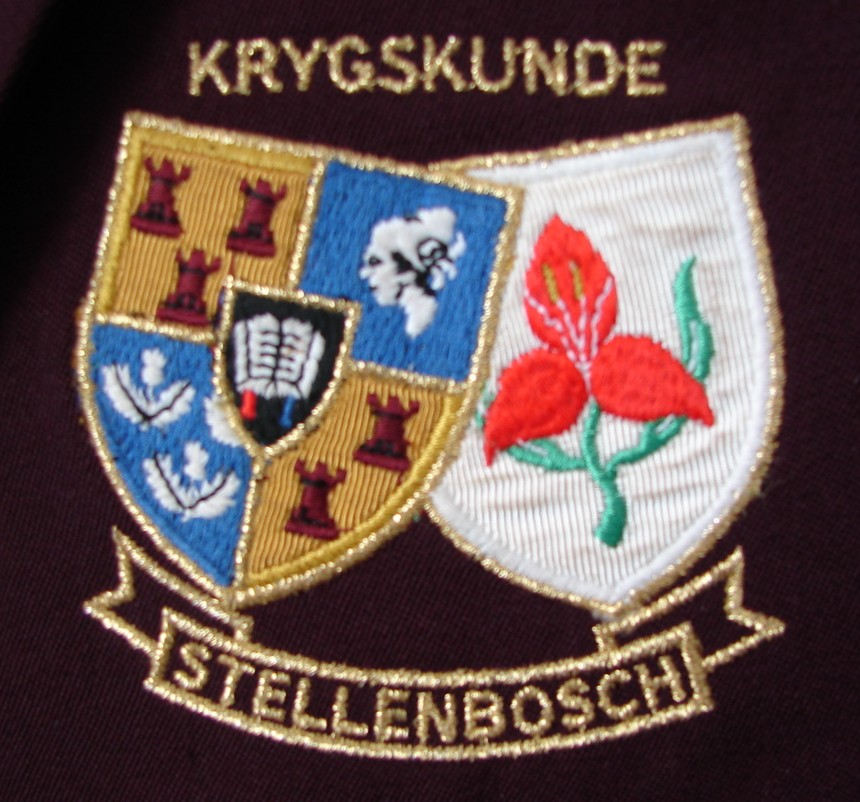
- Former crest of the Military Academy
- Motto: Discendo Armemus (Latin) (Arm yourself through Knowledge)
- Type: Military Academy
- Established: 1 April 1950 as South African Military College (now the South African Army College) in Thaba Tswane)
- Affiliations: Stellenbosch University; South African National Defence Force
- Dean: Prof M. S. Tshehla
- Commandant: Brig Gen A.J. de Castro
- Faculty: 80
- Students: approx. 300 future officers of the four Arms of Service
- Undergraduates: Military Science (B.Mil) in: Science & Technology; Human Resource Development; Security & Africa Studies; Defence Organization & Resource Management
- Postgraduates: Masters Degree in Military Science (M.Mil)
- Location: Saldanha, Western Cape, South Africa
- Campus: Malgaskop, overlooking Saldanha Bay
- Website: http://www.sun.ac.za/english/faculty/milscience/

The South African Military Academy is based on similar principles to that of the military academy system of the United States (United States Military Academy United States Naval Academy United States Air Force Academy). The academy is a military unit of the South African National Defence Force (SANDF) housing the Faculty of Military Science of the University of Stellenbosch. It provides officers of all the arms of service an opportunity to earn a BMil or more advanced degrees. See Military science § University studies.

== History ==
The academy was established on 1 April 1950 under the auspices of the University of Pretoria and the South African Military College (now the South African Army College) in Voortrekkerhoogte (now Thaba Tswane), with the goal of elevating students to a BA (Mil) or BSc (Mil) degree to meet the intellectual challenges of modern war.

In 1954 the newly elected National Party Minister of Defence, Frans Erasmus, wanting to establish the military academy as a separate, independent, all-service institution decided to relocate the academy to Saldanha, his political constituency. In Pretoria it had catered for army and air force students only. The military academy was organisationally divorced from the South African Army College on 1 February 1956. Its headquarters temporarily shifted to Stellenbosch, while suitable accommodation was built at Saldanha starting in 1956. The headquarters of the military academy moved to Saldanha in December 1957 and in February 1958 the first students, second and third-years, reported at Saldanha. It became the Faculty of Military Science of the University of Stellenbosch in 1961, who now awarded a B Mil degree to successful students.

The South African Defence Force's increasing involvement in the Border War from the mid-1970s produced an increased demand for junior officers, with the result that the Defence Force decided that junior officers should be "task qualified" within their respective services before becoming eligible for admission to the military academy. The degree course at the military academy was thus excluded from the development cycle of junior officers from 1976; admittance to the academy then became an option for those who wished to obtain a university degree.

== Organization and administration ==
=== Faculty ===
There are 48 members of the Faculty of Military Science who form an integrated group of military and civilian lecturers. Brig Gen A.J. De Castro is the commandant of the military academy, and the dean of the faculty is Samuel Tshehla.

=== Campus ===
It is situated on the West Coast in the town of Saldanha, set against the scenic slopes of Malgaskop, overlooking Saldanha Bay.

== Academics ==
=== Programmes ===
A three-year bachelor's degree in military science (B. Mil) is awarded to students upon graduation in December. The B. Mil is the generic title for the degree which may be undertaken in two different fields, these being natural science (equivalent to Bsc) and social sciences (equivalent to BA). Traditionally, natural science has been considered the premiere degree due to its highly quantitative nature of its course contents (i.e. mathematics, physics). After graduation, they rejoin their arm of service to serve as officers. Postgraduate qualifications at master's and doctoral level are also offered. After the launch of the PhD programme at the Faculty Military Science, two of the first graduates of this programme were Dr Evert Kleyhans and Capt (SAN) Dr A.P. Putter - both graduating with PhDs in Military Science (December 2018). Both Dr Kleynhans (specialising in Military History) and Capt (SAN) Dr Dries Putter (specialising in Counterintelligence) are now lecturers at the FMS.

=== Students ===
About 300 men and women represent the four arms of service.

== Commandants ==
Until 1967 the dean of the faculty also served as commanding officer of the academy. In 1967 these roles were split, allowing a professional lecturer to act as dean and a military officer to act as commanding officer.

Number	Start of term	End of term	Name	Branch
1st	1 January 1956	1967	Col Pieter J.G. "Vlakkies" de Vos	South African Army
2nd	1968	11 December 1971	Brig Magnus Malan SM	South African Army
3rd	11 December 1971	Jan 1974	Brig Johan D. PotgieterSM	South African Army
4th	1974	21 January 1977	Brig J.P.B. van Loggerenberg SM	South African Air Force
5th	21 January 1977	1980	Brig Alex Potgieter	South African Army
6th	24 January 1980	25 January 1983	Brig F. Shylock Mulder SM	South African Army
7th	25 January 1983	19 January 1987	Brig S. Willie J. Kotze	South African Army
8th	19 January 1987	29 January 1990	Cdre Robert Simpson-Anderson SD SM MMM	South African Navy
9th	29 January 1990	–	Brig Fred E. Du Toit	South African Air Force
13th	–	1996	Brig Pieter O. Verbeek SM MMM	South African Army
14th	1996	1999	Rear Adm (JG) Pieter Potgieter SM MMM	South African Navy
15th	2000	2003	Brig Gen L. Solly Mollo MMS MMM	South African Army
16th	Jan 2004	2006	Brig Gen Tawana Z. Manyama	South African Air Force
17th	2006	2009	Rear Adm (JG) Derek Christian MMM	South African Navy
18th	2009	2011	Brig Gen Lindile Yam CLS MMS	South African Army
19th	2011	date	Brig Gen Lawrence Mbatha	South African Army
20th	2017	2021	Brig Gen G B Pharo	South African Army
21st	2021	date	Brig Gen A J de Castro	South African Air Force

== Annual awards ==
=== Sword of Honour ===
Citation for awards over period 1953-2008

- 1953: I. Lemmer
- 1954: P. C. Smith
- 1955: C. L. Viljoen
- 1956: M. B. Anderson
- 1957: T. H. Smith
- 1958: W.J. Wolmarans
- 1959: B. J. Vorster (Later Later as Brigadier, a Secretary of Personnel Division Staff Council)
- 1960: J. R. F. Irvine
- 1961: D. S. Hamman (Later Maj Gen D.S. Smith )
- 1962: J. G. Coetzee (Later Maj Gen J.G. du P. Coetzee)
- 1963: P. D. Steyn (Later Lieutenant General Pierre Steyn)
- 1964: G. L. Serfontein
- 1965: N. S. L. Steenkamp
- 1966: G. J. C. Marais
- 1967: P. De Villiers
- 1968: L. A. Visagie
- 1969: W. J. Le Crerar
- 1970: P. Richardson
- 1971: T. Fonternel
- 1972: R. J. Strydom
- 1973: B. A. L. Clegg
- 1974: J. P. Nel
- 1975: P. Schöultz (Later Rear Admiral Phillip Schoultz SD SM MMM)
- 1976: L. Rudman (Later Maj Gen Les Rudman PVD SD SM MMM LOM (USA))
- 1977: J. C. Johnson
- 1978: M. C. Durrant
- 1979: C. J. Visagie
- 1980: C. C. Scheepers
- 1981: J. H. Leibbrandt
- 1982: H. J. Rheeders
- 1983: J. Olivier
- 1984: P. J. Introna
- 1985: M. R. Malan
- 1986: W. J. Herbst
- 1987: D. J. Stegmann
- 1988: C. Van Ryneveld
- 1989: J. H. Burger
- 1990: K. Wiesner
- 1991: G. K. Arndt
- 1992: L. Olivier
- 1993: A. M. Booysen
- 1994: B. Eckert
- 1995: J. A. Swart
- 1996: J. F. Laubscher
- 1997: M. Engelbrecht
- 1998: G. J. Pienaar
- 1999: L. B. Riley
- 2000: M. Riley
- 2001: M. J. De Jager
- 2002: P. C. G. S. Jordaan
- 2003: H. A. Visser
- 2004: J. A. Boucher
- 2005: M. C. Kgosana
- 2006: G. W. Mills
- 2007: C. Manganyi
- 2008: N. Wallace

=== Best Student – Army ===
Citation for awards over period 1957-2008

- 1957: P. J. Conradie
- 1958: B. Redelinghuis
- 1959: D. J. Mortimer (Later Chief of Army Staff Logistics)
- 1960: W. J. Badenhorst (Later Inspector General SADF)
- 1961: M. S. Verster
- 1962: J. G. Coetzee (Later Chief of Army Staff Personnel)
- 1963: J. M. Van Rooyen
- 1964: R. T. Deyzel
- 1965: N. S. L. Steenkamp
- 1966: G. N. Opperman
- 1967: P. De Villiers
- 1968: A. J. Van Niekerk
- 1969: W. J. Le Crerar
- 1970: P. Richardson
- 1971: T. E. Fonternel
- 1972: R. J. Strydom
- 1973: J. Jooste (Later Chief Director Force Structures)
- 1974: J. P. Nel
- 1975: G. Liebenberg
- 1976: L. Rudman (Later Maj Gen Les Rudman PVD SD SM MMM LOM (USA))
- 1977: A. K. Calmeyer
- 1978: M. C. Durrant
- 1979: D. J. Putter
- 1980: C. C. Scheepers
- 1981: J. H. Leibbrandt
- 1982: H. J. Rheeders
- 1983: J. Olivier
- 1984: P. J. Introna
- 1985: M. R. Malan
- 1986: W. J. Herbst
- 1987: A. N. Walters
- 1988: J. C. G. Terblanche
- 1989: J. H. Burger
- 1990: K. J. Stanz
- 1991: J. W. A. Cheminais
- 1992: N. Vertue
- 1993: A. M. Booysen
- 1994: P. B. Jansen
- 1995: C. F. Claassens
- 1996: A. Pretorius
- 1997: D. J. De Villiers
- 1998: G. J. Pienaar
- 1999: L. B. Riley
- 2000: J. Tempelhoff
- 2001: M. J. De Jager
- 2002: H. Dalton
- 2003: J. D. Quma
- 2004: J. A. Boucher
- 2005: M. C.Kgosana
- 2006: G. W. Mills
- 2007: A. Van Der Merwe
- 2008: N. Wallace

=== Best Student – Airforce ===
Citation for awards over period 1957-2005

- 1957: J. P. B. Van Loggerenberg
- 1958: I. J. Van Der Merwe
- 1959: B. J. Vorster
- 1960: A. G. W. Coetzee
- 1961: J. Kriel (Later Maj Gen Julius Kriel not to be confused with Lt Gen James Kriel)
- 1962: P. J. Van Rensburg
- 1963: P. D. Steyn
- 1964: G. L. Serfontein
- 1965: J. W. Van Niekerk
- 1966: M. A. De Vries
- 1967: J. A. Zimmerman
- 1968: L. N. Le Roux
- 1969: D. W. K. Lynch (Later Brig Des Lynch)
- 1970: I. C. Van Der Vyver
- 1971: P. B. Willcock
- 1972: R. C. Warncke
- 1973: E. F. C. Duminy
- 1974: G. L. Bornman
- 1975: Not Awarded
- 1976: K. O. Badenhorst
- 1977: J. C. Van Niekerk
- 1978: G. K. B. Barron
- 1979: C. J. Visagie
- 1980: S. F. Steyn
- 1981: D. W. Fouche
- 1982: J. Arnold
- 1983: J. F. Erasmus
- 1984: E. J. Ferreira
- 1985: J. H. Erasmus
- 1986: S. J. Naude
- 1987: D. J. Stegman
- 1988: C. Van Ryneveld
- 1989: D. J. De Beer
- 1990: L. De W. Fourie
- 1991: G. K. Arndt
- 1992: J. C. J. Butler (Later Chief Director Force Preparation SAAF)
- 1993: A. J. Du Preez
- 1994: B. Eckert
- 1995: J. A. Swart
- 1996: J. F. Laubscher
- 1997: M. Engelbrecht
- 1998: L. S. Mnyandu
- 1999: A. E. J. Putter
- 2000: M. Riley
- 2001: J. D. Jordaan
- 2002: P. C. G. S. Jordaan
- 2003: H. A. Visser
- 2004: K. Nobaza
- 2005: R. C. Haggard

=== Best Student – Navy ===
Citation for awards over period 1957-2008

- 1957: J. A. De Kock
- 1958: W. R. Joubert (Later Commodore)
- 1959: C. Grobbelaar
- 1960: R. Eberlein
- 1961: W. J. De Lange
- 1962: P. G. Odendaal
- 1963: H. P. Brink
- 1964: J. A. Joubert
- 1965: H. J. M. Trainor
- 1966: G. J. C. Marais
- 1967: J. F. Retief
- 1968: L. A. Visagie
- 1969: B. D. Law
- 1970: S. K. Stead (Later Later R Adm (JG) Steven Stead)
- 1971: F. E. Koetje
- 1972: P. S. Van Dyk
- 1973: P. C. Crathorne
- 1974: J. E. Louw
- 1975: P. Schoultz
- 1976: N. F. Snyman
- 1977: J. C. Johnson
- 1978: Not awarded
- 1979: A. M. Corbin
- 1980: R. W. Higgs
- 1981: S. H. Norval
- 1982: J. C. Visser
- 1983: M. R. M. Dendale
- 1984: C. H. Wright
- 1985: A. S. Claydon-Fink
- 1986: J. Hougaard
- 1987: H. Fischer
- 1988: J. Brawley
- 1989: P. A. Schoeman
- 1990: K. Wiesner
- 1991: M. S. Blaine
- 1992: L. Olivier
- 1993: K. Naidoo (Later R Adm (JG) Kasaval Naidoo)
- 1994: A. Parsadh
- 1995: M. De Beer
- 1996: Not awarded
- 1997: L. Du Plooy
- 1998: C. G. Maritz
- 1999: G. R. Walker
- 2000: T. C. Matthews
- 2001: C. Slingerland
- 2002: T. Long
- 2003: J. A. Kotze
- 2004: L. Van Zyl
- 2005: H. E. X. Novoa
- 2006: D. D. M. Dywili
- 2007: C. Manganyi
- 2008: C. Y.Ruiters

=== Best Student - Defense Intelligence Division ===
- 2001: J.C. Du Plooy

== See also ==
- Military history of South Africa
