= Admiral Christian =

Admiral Christian may refer to:

- Arthur Christian (1863–1926), British Royal Navy admiral
- Hood Hanway Christian (1784–1849), British Royal Navy rear admiral
- Hugh Cloberry Christian (1747–1798), British Royal Navy rear admiral
- Derek Christian
