= Chief of Corporate Staff =

Corporate Staff Division
- Country: South Africa
- Allegiance: South Africa

Commanders
- Chief of Staff, SANDF: Lt Gen Michael Ramantswana
- Deputy Chief of Staff SANDF: Maj Gen Bonginkosi Ncqobo

The Chief of Corporate Staff (CCS) is a lieutenant general post in the South African National Defence Force

== Role ==
The post of Chief of Corporate Staff was created in 2000. The post was first occupied by V Adm H.J.M. Trainor in late 2000. Chief of Corporate Staff reports to the Chief of the Defence Force and has equal standing as the arms of services. The restructuring after the Defence Review of 1998 paved way for changes in the SANDF, among others being the closing down of the Personnel Division and its functions were transferred to the Joint Support Division. The Chief of Corporate Staff consists of the Strategy and Planning Office, Religious Services, Defence Communications, Defence Reserves and Defence Legal Dept.

== Past appointments ==
=== Chief of Corporate Staff ===
- V Adm Martyn Trainor SD SM MMM
- Lt Gen Themba Matanzima CCM SM MMM
- Lt Gen (Dr) Jurinus Janse van Rensburg SD SM MMM
- Lt Gen (Dr) Vejaynand Ramlakan DMG MMS MMB
- Lt Gen Vusumuzi Masondo MMM

=== Chief of Staff, SANDF ===
In 2017, the designation was changed during Lt Gen Masondo's tenure to that of simply Chief of Staff.

- Lt Gen Vusumuzi Masondo MMM
- Lt Gen Lindile Yam CLS MMS
- Lt Gen Michael Ramantswana MMM

== See also ==
- Chief of Defence Force Staff
