= Chief of the South African National Defence Force =

Head of the armed forces of South Africa

- Flag of the SANDF

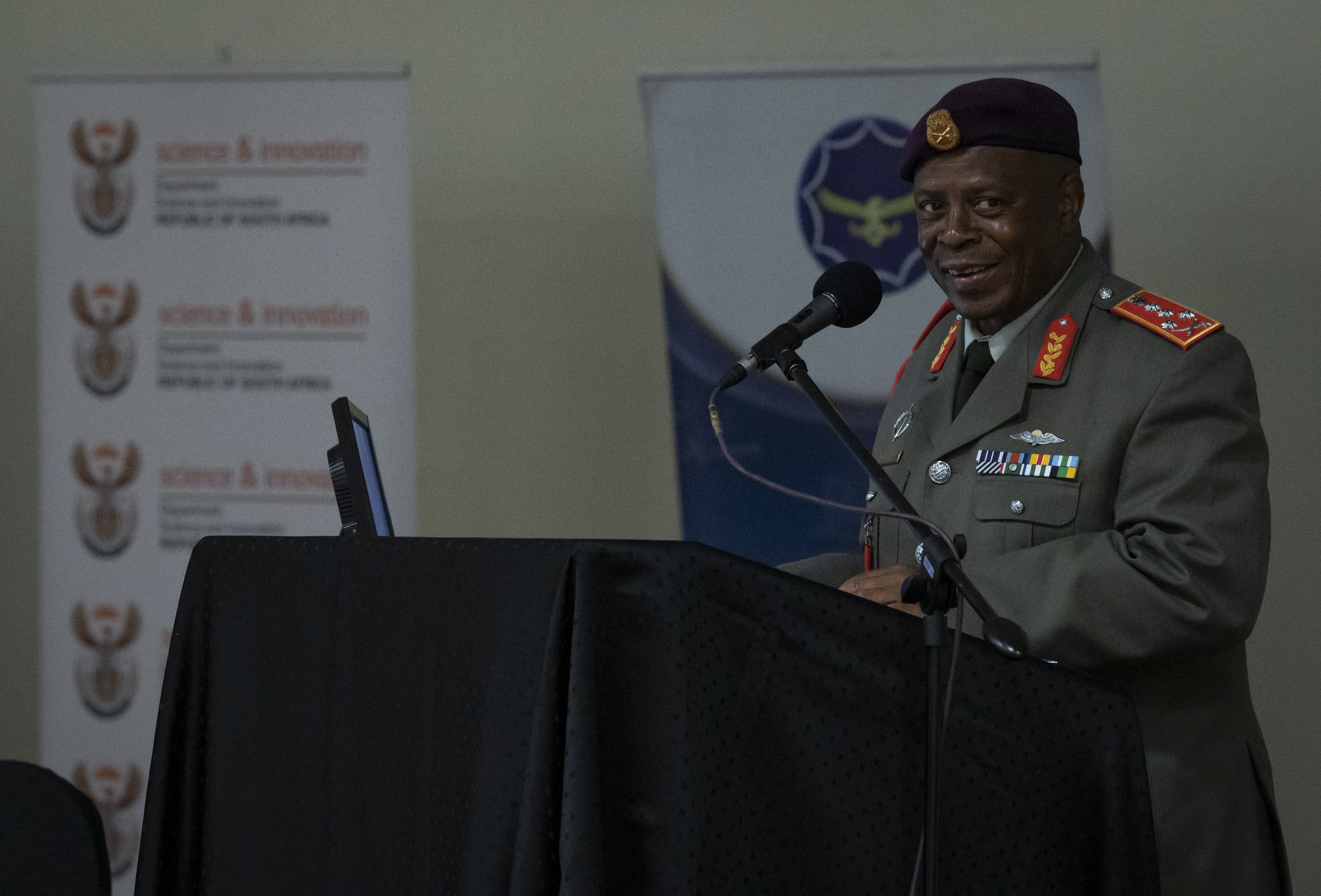
- Incumbent; General Rudzani Maphwanya since 1 June 2021
- Department of Defence
- Reports to: Minister of Defence and Military Veterans
- Seat: Pretoria, Gauteng
- Nominator: President of South Africa
- Precursor: Chief of the South African Defence Force
- Formation: 27 April 1994
- First holder: General Georg Meiring

The Chief of the South African National Defence Force is the most senior South African military officer and the professional Head of the South African National Defence Force (SANDF). The Chief is appointed by the President of South Africa.

The SANDF was formed in 1994 following the first democratic general election in South Africa and was created by an amalgamation of the Azanian People's Liberation Army (APLA), uMkhonto weSizwe (MK) as well as the existing South African Defence Force (SADF) structure of Army, Air Force, Navy, and Medical Service (which was renamed Military Health Service in 1998).

== Constitutional role ==
In terms of the South African Constitution the role of the Chief of the South African National Defence Force is to

1. Act as the principal adviser to the Minister on any military, operational and administrative matters
2. Maintain a military response capability
3. Formulate and issuing military policy and doctrines

== Chiefs of the SANDF ==
No.	Portrait	Chief of the SANDF	Took office	Left office	Time in office	Defence branch	Ref.
1	Georg Meiring SSAS, SD, SM, MMM, ORB	General; Georg Meiring SSAS, SD, SM, MMM, ORB (1939–2024)	27 April 1994	31 May 1998	4 years, 34 days	South African Army	—
2	Siphiwe Nyanda SSA, SBS, CLS, DMG, MMS, MMM	General; Siphiwe Nyanda SSA, SBS, CLS, DMG, MMS, MMM (born 1950)	1 June 1998	31 May 2005	6 years, 364 days	South African Army	—
3	Godfrey Ngwenya SBG, DMG, MMS, LOM (USA)	General; Godfrey Ngwenya SBG, DMG, MMS, LOM (USA) (born 1950)	1 June 2005	1 May 2011	5 years, 334 days	South African Army	—
4	Solly Shoke OMBG, SBS, MMS, OMS	General; Solly Shoke OMBG, SBS, MMS, OMS (born 1956)	2 May 2011	30 May 2021	10 years, 28 days	South African Army	
5	Rudzani Maphwanya SM, MMM	General; Rudzani Maphwanya SM, MMM (born 1960)	1 June 2021	Incumbent	5 years, 161 days	South African Army	

== See also ==
- List of South African military chiefs
