= Derrick Mgwebi =

South African Army Commander (born 1956)

Lieutenant General Derrick Mbuyiselo Mgwebi SD SM MMM
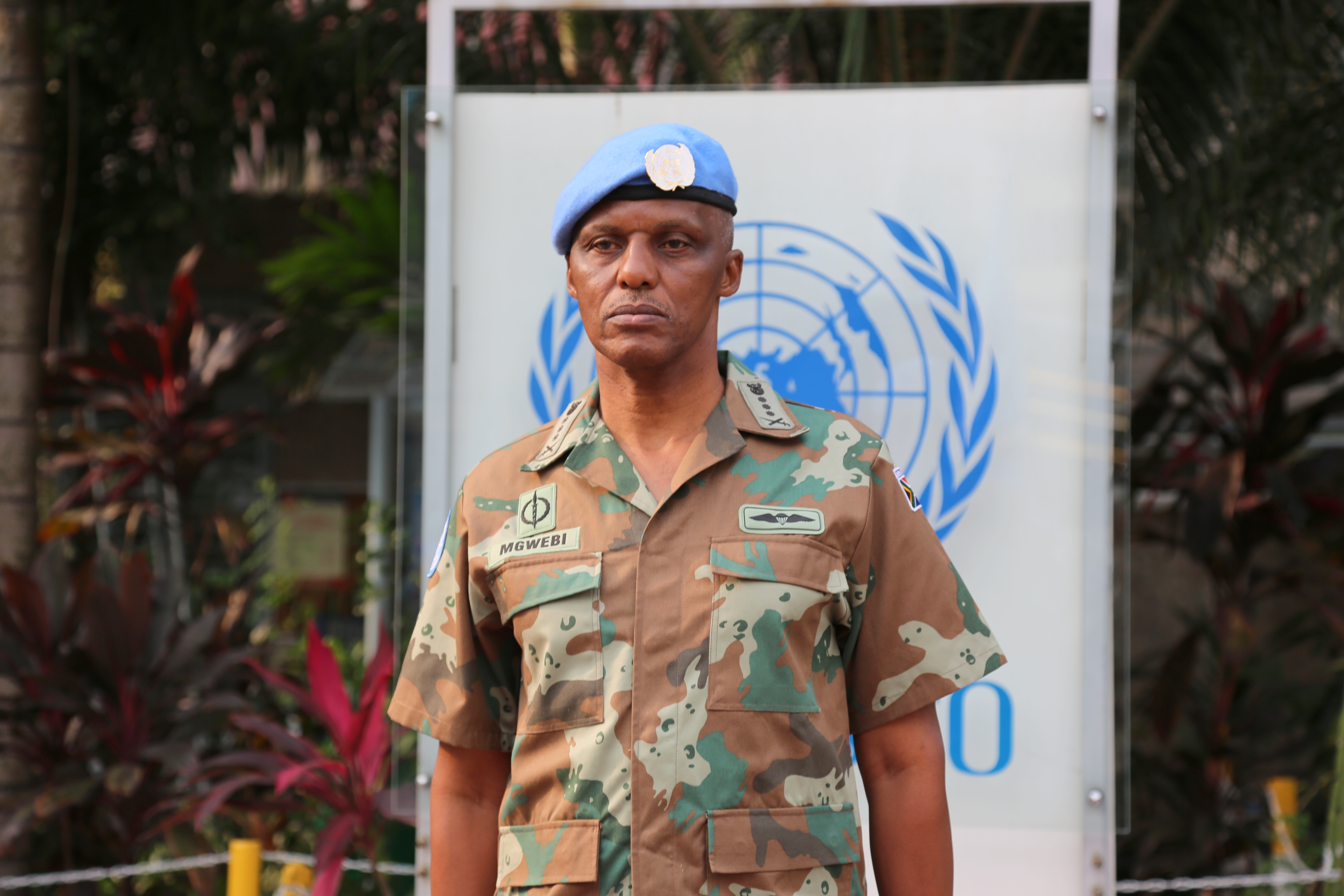
- As head of Monusco
- Born: 1956 (age 69–70)
- Spouse: Busisiwe (wife)
- Military career
- Allegiance: South Africa
- Branch: South African Army
- Service years: 1978–2018
- Rank: Lieutenant General
- Commands: Force Commander United Nations Stabilization Mission in DR Congo; Chief Joint Operations; Chief of Human Resources, SANDF; Chief Director Force Preparation, SA Army; Force Commander United Nations Operation in Burundi in 2004; Force Commander African Mission in Burundi; GOC SA Army Infantry Fmn; GOC Mpumalanga Command
- Awards: Southern Cross Decoration SD Southern Cross Medal SM Military Merit Medal MMM Military Rule Medal General Service Medal (South Africa) Unitas (Unity) Medal Mandela Commemoration Medal Medalje vir Troue Diens (Medal for Loyal Service) Good Service Medal Faithful Service Medal Transkei Defence Force Medal African Union Medal United Nations Medal

Lieutenant General Derrick Mgwebi SD SM MMM (born 1956) is a South African military commander, serving as Director of the Joint Operations Division.

== Military career ==
He served as Commander of the United Nations Operation in Burundi in 2004. He also served as General Officer Commanding, Mpumalanga Command, after which he was appointed General Officer Commanding South African Army Infantry Formation. Before taking over at Joint Operations he was the Chief of Human Resources for the SANDF.

He was Force Commander of the United Nations MONUSCO mission to the DRC from December 2015 to January 2018.

== Appointed amaXhosa King ==
Gen Mgwebi has been at the centre of controversy about the royal succession of the Xhosa King. He was appointed to the position for three months while internal negotiations have taken place to make a final decision.

== Awards and decorations ==
- Southern Cross Decoration (SD)
- Southern Cross Medal (1975) (SM)
- Military Merit Medal (MMM)
- General Service Medal (South Africa)
- Military Rule Medal
- Unitas (Unity) Medal
- Mandela Commemoration Medal (Gold)
- Medalje vir Troue Diens (Medal for Loyal Service) (30 Year Clasp)
- Good Service Medal (Silver (20 Years))
- Faithful Service Medal (10 Years)
- Transkei Defence Force Medal
- African Union Medal (Intervention in Burundi)
- United Nations Medal (MONUSCO - DRC (Numeral 1))

== Proficiency and Qualification badges ==
Proficiency badges
SA Special Forces Operator's Badge (Qualification) Black on Thatch beige, Embossed. Dagger enclosed with a laurel wreath	Paratrooper Basic (Qualification) Basic, Static Line. Black on Thatch beige, Embossed. Small Black wings

Government offices
Preceded by Tsepe Motumi	A/Director General Military Veterans Affairs; 2018–2020	Succeeded by Irene Mpolweni
Diplomatic posts
Preceded by Carlos Alberto dos Santos Cruz	Force Commander MONUSCO; 2016–2018	Succeeded by Lt Gen Martins Filho
Military offices
Preceded by Themba Matanzima	Chief of Joint Operations; 2011–2016	Succeeded by Duma Mdutyana
Preceded by Themba Matanzima	Chief of Human Resources; 2007–2011	Succeeded by Themba Nkabinde
Preceded by Paul Ramahlo	Chief Director Force Preparation; Jan 2007–Aug 2007	Succeeded by Vusi Masondo
Preceded by Established	GOC Joint Operational Headquarters; 2003–2004	Succeeded by Barney Hlatswayo
Preceded by Established	GOC SA Army Infantry Fmn; 1999–2002	Succeeded by Themba Nkabinde
Preceded by Deon Ferreira	GOC Mpumalanga Command; 1997–1999	Succeeded by Disbanded
