= Thabiso Mokhosi =

South African Army officer (c.1968–2019)

Lieutenant General Thabiso Mokhosi
- Thabiso Collin Mokhosi
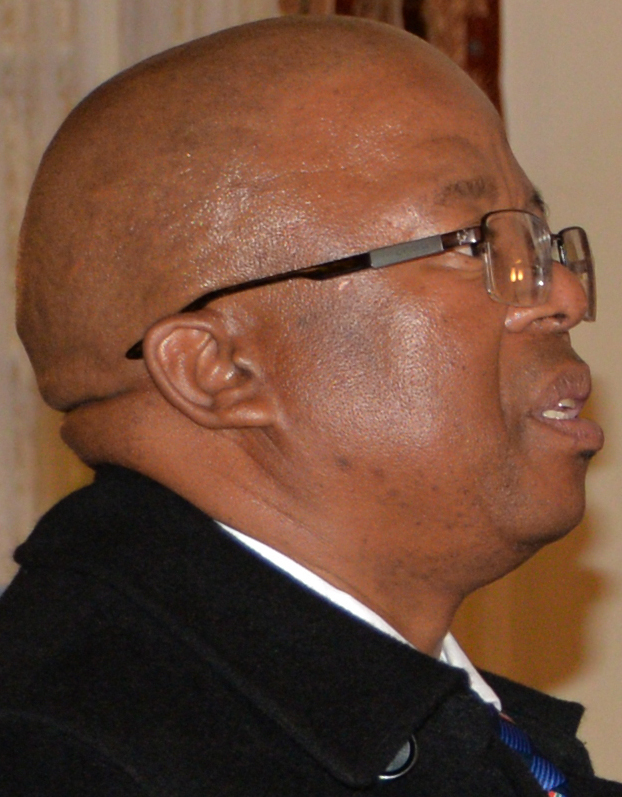
- Mokhosi in 2018
- Born: c. 1968; Port Elizabeth
- Died: 10 December 2019 (aged 50–51); Pretoria
- Military career
- Allegiance: South Africa
- Branch: South African Army
- Rank: Lieutenant General
- Commands: Chief of the South African Army; GOC Joint Operations HQ; Commandant, SA Army College; OC 1 SA infantry Mechanised Battalion

Thabiso Collin Mokhosi (c. 1968 – 10 December 2019) was a South African Army officer, who served briefly as Chief of the South African Army.

He completed his military training in Angola before attending demolition and operational command and control courses in Ukraine, Soviet Union.

He also completed a logistics course in Italy in 1992 after which he returned to South Africa. He served as the Officer Commanding 1 South African Infantry Battalion, Commandant South African Army College. Aide de Camp to the Chief of the SANDF, Director Peace Support Operations before being promoted to major general when he was appointed as General Officer Commanding Joint Operations Headquarters until 31 October 2019.

He was appointed Chief of the Army on 1 November 2019 and was due to fill the post in 2020 but was subsequently unable to due to illness.

Mokhosi died in hospital on 10 December 2019.

Military offices
Preceded by Lt Gen Lindile Yam	Chief of the South African Army; 2019–2019	Vacant Title next held by Lt Gen Lawrence Mbatha in 2020
Preceded by Maj Gen Jabulani Nkabinde	GOC J Ops HQ; 2017–2019	Succeeded by Maj Gen Lucky Sangweni
Preceded by Brig Gen Linda Selepe	Director Peace Support Operations; 2015–2017	Succeeded by Brig Gen Viscount Ncqobo
