= Mannetjies =

Mannetjies is a given name. Notable people with the name include:

- Mannetjies de Goede, South African officer
- Mannetjies Roux (born 1939), South African rugby player
