= Themba Matanzima =

Lieutenant General Themba Templeton Matanzima CCM, SM, MMM
- Born: 2 February 1953 (age 73); Cofimvaba, Cape Province, Union of South Africa
- Military career
- Allegiance: South Africa
- Branch: South African Army
- Service years: 1977–2011
- Rank: Lieutenant General
- Unit: 1 Transkei Battalion
- Commands: Chief of Joint Operations; Chief Human Resources; Chief of Corporate Staff; Chief of Joint Support; Chief of Personnel, SANDF; Chief of Army Staff Personnel; Chief of Army Corporate Services; GOC Eastern Province Command; Chief of the TDF; Chief of Staff of the TDF
- Awards: Paratrooper Basic
- Other work: Military Ombudsman

Lieutenant General Themba Matanzima CCM SM MMM is a former South African Army officer, serving as Military Ombudsman.

He was born on 2 February 1953 in Cofimvaba. He joined the Transkei Defence Force in January 1977.

== Army career ==
Matanzima transferred to the South African National Defence Force on integration in 1994. After a period on the Joint Military Coordinating Committee that oversaw the integration process, he then became General Officer Commanding Eastern Province Command in 1996. In 1998 he became Chief of Army Personnel.

In 1999 he was appointed Chief of Personnel and promoted to the rank of lieutenant general. In 2000, the SANDF restructured and he was appointed into a newly created post of Chief of Joint Support.

In 2004, he was appointed Chief of Corporate Staff until 2005, when he became Chief Human Resources.

He was appointed Chief of Joint Operations on 1 September 1, 2007 after the death of Lt Gen Sipho Binda in car accident in 2006.

In 2010, he served as acting Secretary for Defence and Acting CSANDF on a number of occasions.

== Honours and awards ==
Paratrooper Basic (Qualification)
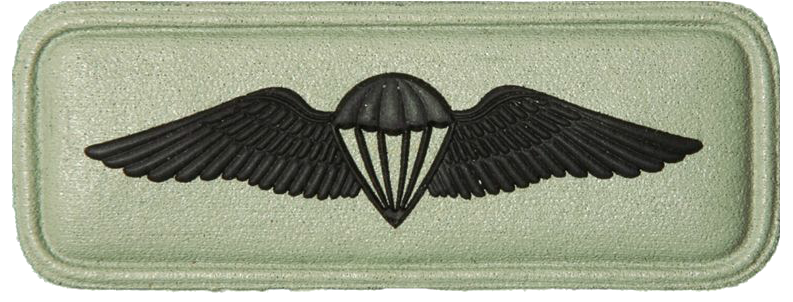
Basic, Static Line. Black on Thatch beige, Embossed. Small Black wings

He has been awarded the following:

- Commander Class Medal (CCM)
- Southern Cross Medal (1975) (SM)
- Military Merit Medal (MMM)
- Military Rule Medal
- General Service Medal (South Africa)
- Unitas (Unity) Medal
- Transkei Defence Force Medal
- Medalje vir Troue Diens (Medal for Loyal Service) (30 Year Clasp)
- Good Service Medal (Silver (20 Years))
- Faithful Service Medal (10 Years)

Government offices
Preceded by Tsepe Motumi	Secretary for Defence Acting; 2010	Succeeded by Mpumi Mpofu
Military offices
New title Office of the Ombudsman established	Military Ombud; 2011–2019	Succeeded by Vusumuzi Masondo
Preceded by Sipho Binda	Chief of Joint Operations; 2007–2011	Succeeded by Derrick Mgwebi
New title HR Division established	Chief of Human Resources; 2005–2007	Succeeded by Derrick Mgwebi
Preceded by Martyn Trainor	Chief of Corporate Staff; 2004–2005	Succeeded by Jurinus Janse van Rensburg
New title Established	Chief of Joint Support; 2000–2004	Succeeded by Sipho Binda
Preceded by Piet Loedolff	Chief of Personnel; 1999–2000	Disbanded
Preceded by Toon Slabbert	GOC EP Command; 1995–1998	Succeeded by Dan Mofokeng
Unknown	Chief of the TDF; 1993–1994	Abolished and integrated into the SANDF
