= Norman Yengeni =

- Children: Lethu Yengeni
- Relatives: Tony Yengeni (brother)
- Military career
- Allegiance: South Africa
- Branch: South African Army
- Rank: Lieutenant general
- Commands: Chief of Human Resources; Chief Director Human Resource Management

Norman Yengeni is a retired South African Army officer who served as Chief of Human Resources.

He served as Chief Director Human Resource Management from 2012 to 2014 before being promoted to Chief of Human Resources. He retired in 2019.

Military offices
Preceded by Themba Nkabinde	Chief of Human Resources; 2014 – 2019	Succeeded by Asiel Kubu
