= Barney Hlatswayo =

South African Army officer

Lieutenant General Barney Norman Hlatswayo GDM
- Muntu
- Born: 1958 (age 67–68)
- Military career
- Allegiance: South Africa
- Branch: South African Army
- Service years: 1994–2019
- Rank: Lieutenant General
- Commands: Chief Joint Operations; Chief Director Joint Operations Development; Chief Director Operations; GOC Joint Operations Headquarters
- Awards: Decoration for Merit GDM Unitas (Unity) Medal Medalje vir Troue Diens (Medal for Loyal Service) Good Service Medal Service Medal

Lieutenant General Barney Hlatswayo GDM (born 1958) was a South African Army officer who served as Chief of Joint Operations from 2018 until his retirement in 2019.

== Military career ==
He served in the APLA in Tanzania and integrated into the SANDF in 1994. He served as GOC Joint Operations HQ, Chief Director Operations, Chief Director Operational Development, Chief of Staff Joint Operations Division and finally Chief of Joint Operations from 2018. He retired with pension from the SANDF on 31 October 2019.

== Awards and decorations ==
- Decoration for Merit (Gold) (GDM)
- Unitas (Unity) Medal
- Medalje vir Troue Diens (Medal for Loyal Service) (30 Year Clasp)
- Good Service Medal (Silver (20 Years))
- Service Medal (Bronze)

Military offices
Preceded by Duma Mdutyana	Chief of Joint Operations; 2018–2019	Succeeded by Rudzani Maphwanya
Preceded by George Mphafi	Chief Director Operations Development; 2011–2015	Succeeded by Monde Mbiza
Preceded by Phillip Schoultz	Chief Director Operations; 2010–2011	Succeeded by Duma Mdutyana
Preceded by Derrick Mgwebi	GOC Joint Operations Headquarters; 2005–2010	Succeeded by Duma Mdutyana
