= Phila Portia Ndwandwe =

South African freedom fighter (1965-1988)

- Born: 2 June 1965
- Died: 1988 (aged 22–23)
- Cause of death: murdered
- Organization: uMkhonto weSizwe
- Awards: Order of Mendi for Bravery in Silver

Phila Portia Ndwandwe (2 June 1965 – 1988), also known as Zandile or Zandi, was a fighter of the Natal cadre of uMkhonto weSizwe (MK) formed by Muzi Ngwenya (Thami Zulu or “TZ”) operating from Swaziland. MK was the armed wing (Spear of the Nation) of the African National Congress (ANC), created by Nelson Mandela in 1961.

== KwaZulu-Natal origins ==
21-year-old Zandi was a Dental Therapy student when she was recruited into the ANC and became an MK fighter. Three years later, she was an activist living in Durban, was under surveillance and was arrested on terrorism charges before fleeing to exile in Swaziland. She was abducted in Swaziland by Durban Security Branch members at the Manzini Arms, a residence, then was tortured and executed.

Hers was the first body disinterred by the Truth and Reconciliation commission (TRC). During the TRC's hearing the Officer that confessed to being part of the group that shot her led authorities to the place on the Elandkop farm where they had buried her. On March 12, 1997, Ndwandwe's skeleton was unearthed in a field in KwaZulu-Natal and her 9-year-old son attended her state funeral with his grandparents and Nelson Mandela. She had been stripped and beaten repeatedly in an effort to 'turn' her but she steadfastly refused to talk. One of her captors described her refusal as "brave, very brave." Having no prosecutable evidence against Zandi they decided to kill her and hide the body, covering it with lime and a plastic sheet. 11 former members of the security forces received amnesty and the informers who kidnapped her were not revealed.

Her father, Nason Ndwandwe had feared that she had become an 'askari' accomplice or informer to the apartheid regime when she did not return with Nelson Mandela and the ANC in 1993, so he applied to the TRC for a formal inquiry. TRC investigator Stephanie Miller found evidence of a police 'hit squad' operating in Durban and brought pressure to bear on the members. By 1997 those whom had applied for amnesty revealed to the commission the story of her abduction and subsequent murder. After her disappearance her family had been told that she had eloped to Tanzania.

== Memorials and awards ==
In 2003 Ndwandwe received the Order of Mendi for Bravery in Silver for:

Demonstrating Bravery and valor and for sacrificing her life for her comrades in the cause for a non-racial, non-sexist and democratic South Africa.

There is a road named for her memory in Isipingo Rail, south of Durban in the eThekwini Metropolitan Municipality, KwaZulu-Natal, South Africa. Another road in eThekwini named Phila Ndwandwe Road is located in the N-section of Umlazi.

Art that was dedicated to her homemade plastic panties, a floating blue plastic dress by artist Judith Mason titled "BLUE DRESS" is hanging in the Constitutional Court in the city of Johannesburg.

Partial text on hem of "BLUE DRESS":

Sister, a plastic bag may not be the whole armor of God, but you were wrestling with flesh and blood, and against powers, against the rulers of darkness, against spiritual wickedness in sordid places.

== See also ==
- Victoria Mxenge
- Albie Sachs
