= Jurinus Janse van Rensburg =

South African military commander and surgeon (1952–present)

Lieutenant General Jurinus (Rinus) Janse van Rensburg SD SM MMM KStJ
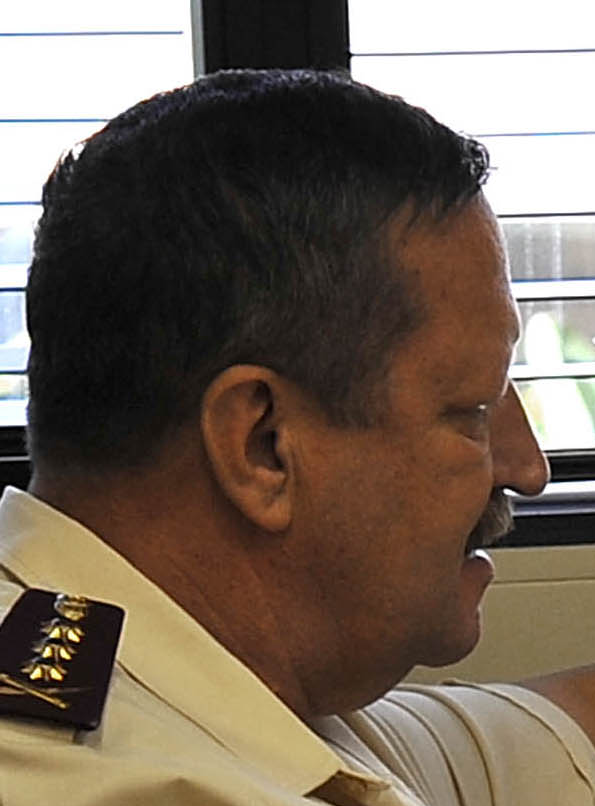
- Born: 7 January 1952 (age 74); Murraysburg, Cape Province Union of South Africa (now Western Cape Province)
- Military career
- Allegiance: South Africa
- Branch: South African Military Health Service
- Service years: 1970 – 2010
- Rank: Lieutenant General
- Commands: South African Military Health Service; 1 Military Hospital
- Awards: Southern Cross Decoration SD Southern Cross Medal SM Military Merit Medal MMM Pro Patria Medal Southern Africa Medal General Service Medal (South Africa) Good Service Medal Venerable Order of Saint John KStJ CISM Order of Merit

Lieutenant General Jurinus (Rinus) Janse van Rensburg, SD SM MMM KStJ (born 7 January 1952) is a former South African military commander. He joined the South African Military Health Service in 1972 and commanded it, as Surgeon-General, from 2000 to 2005. He served as Chief of Corporate Staff from 1 August 2005 until his retirement in 2010.

== Early life ==
He was born on 7 January 1952 in Murraysburg, in the Karoo and matriculated at Paarl Boys' High School in 1969. He joined the Defence Force in 1970 and was stationed at 1 Maintenance Unit at Lenz. It was during this period that he decided to study medicine and so commenced medical studies at the University of Pretoria.

== Military career ==
After completing his degree in 1976 he became a medical officer at 1 Military Hospital. In 1980 he was transferred to the then South African Medical Service Headquarters as the Senior Operational Officer, and during the same year was transferred to the then South West Africa Medical Command, Sector 10, as a medical officer.

In 1983 he became the SO2 Medical Training Command. He was appointed to his first command position in 1986, when he became the Officer Commanding of the then South West Africa Medical Command. In 1989 he was promoted to the rank of Brigadier General and became the General Officer Commanding of 1 Military Hospital.

In 1994 he was transferred back to the SAMHS Headquarters as Chief of Staff Planning until he was appointed Chief of Medical Force Application in 1997. On 1 October 2000 he succeeded the late Lt. Gen. Davidson Masuku, as the Surgeon General of the SANDF, a position he held until 31 July 2005. He was appointed Chief of Corporate Staff on 1 August 2005.

== Awards and decorations ==
Lt. Gen. Janse van Rensburg received the following awards during his career:

- Southern Cross Decoration (SD)
- Southern Cross Medal (1975) (SM)
- Military Merit Medal (MMM)
- Pro Patria Medal
- Southern Africa Medal
- General Service Medal (South Africa)
- Good Service Medal (Gold (30 Years))
- Good Service Medal (Silver (20 Years))
- Good Service Medal (Bronze (10 Years))
- Venerable Order of Saint John (Gr II - Knight of Justice or Grace) (KStJ)
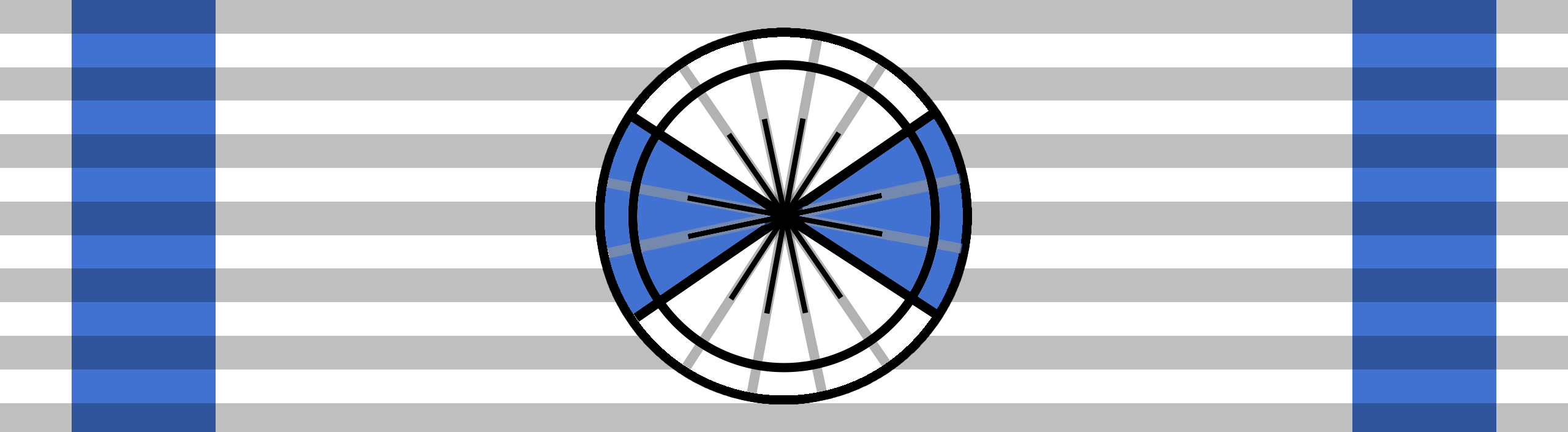
- CISM Order of Merit (Officer)

He became a Knight of St John in 2001

== See also ==
- List of South African military chiefs
- South African Medical Service

Military offices
Preceded by Themba Matanzima	Chief of Corporate Staff; 2005–2010	Succeeded by Vejaynand Ramlakan
Preceded by Davidson Masuku	Chief of the South African Military Health Service; 2000–2005	Succeeded by Vejaynand Ramlakan
Preceded by Ken Ingram	Chief of Medical Force Application; 1997–2000	Succeeded by Mayfort Radebe
