= Duma Mdutyana =

Lieutenant General Duma Dumisani Mdutyana MMB
- Born: 18 December 1960; Mount Frere, Eastern Cape
- Died: 6 July 2016 (aged 55)
- Military career
- Allegiance: South Africa
- Branch: South African Army
- Rank: Lieutenant General
- Nickname: Ray
- Commands: Chief of Joint Operations; GOC 43 South African Brigade; OC HQ Group 6
- Awards: Merit Medal MMB General Service Medal (South Africa) Unitas (Unity) Medal Medalje vir Troue Diens (Medal for Loyal Service) Good Service Medal Service Medal

Lieutenant General Duma Mdutyana MMB (18 December 1960 in Mount Frere – 6 July 2016) was a South African Army officer who served as Chief of Joint Operations. He died after falling ill on a trip overseas.

== Education ==
He matriculated from St. Johns College in Umtata and later obtained a master's degree in Defence Studies from Madras University, India.

== Military career ==
He served in the uMkhonto we Sizwe in Angola and after integrating into the SANDF, he served at EP Command, OC Group 6 and at Infantry Directorate before being appointed GOC 43 South African Brigade. He served as GOC Joint Operations HQ, Advisor to FARDC, Chief of Defence Staff and Chief Director Operations from 2011.

== Awards and decorations ==
- Merit Medal (Bronze) (MMB)
- General Service Medal (South Africa)
- Unitas (Unity) Medal
- Medalje vir Troue Diens (Medal for Loyal Service) (30 Year Clasp)
- Good Service Medal (Silver (20 Years))
- Service Medal (Bronze)

Military offices
Preceded by Derrick Mgwebi	Chief of Joint Operations; 2016–2016	Succeeded by Barney Hlatswayo
Preceded by Barney Hlatswayo	Chief Director Operations; 2011–2016	Succeeded by Mlandeli Kula
Preceded by Barney Hlatswayo	GOC Joint Operations HQ; 2010–2011	Succeeded by William Nkonyeni
Preceded by Steve Kobe	GOC 43 South African Brigade; 2002–2005	Succeeded by Lawrence Smith
