= Asiel Kubu =

South African Navy officer

Asiel Elias Leaka Kubu PG PS PB
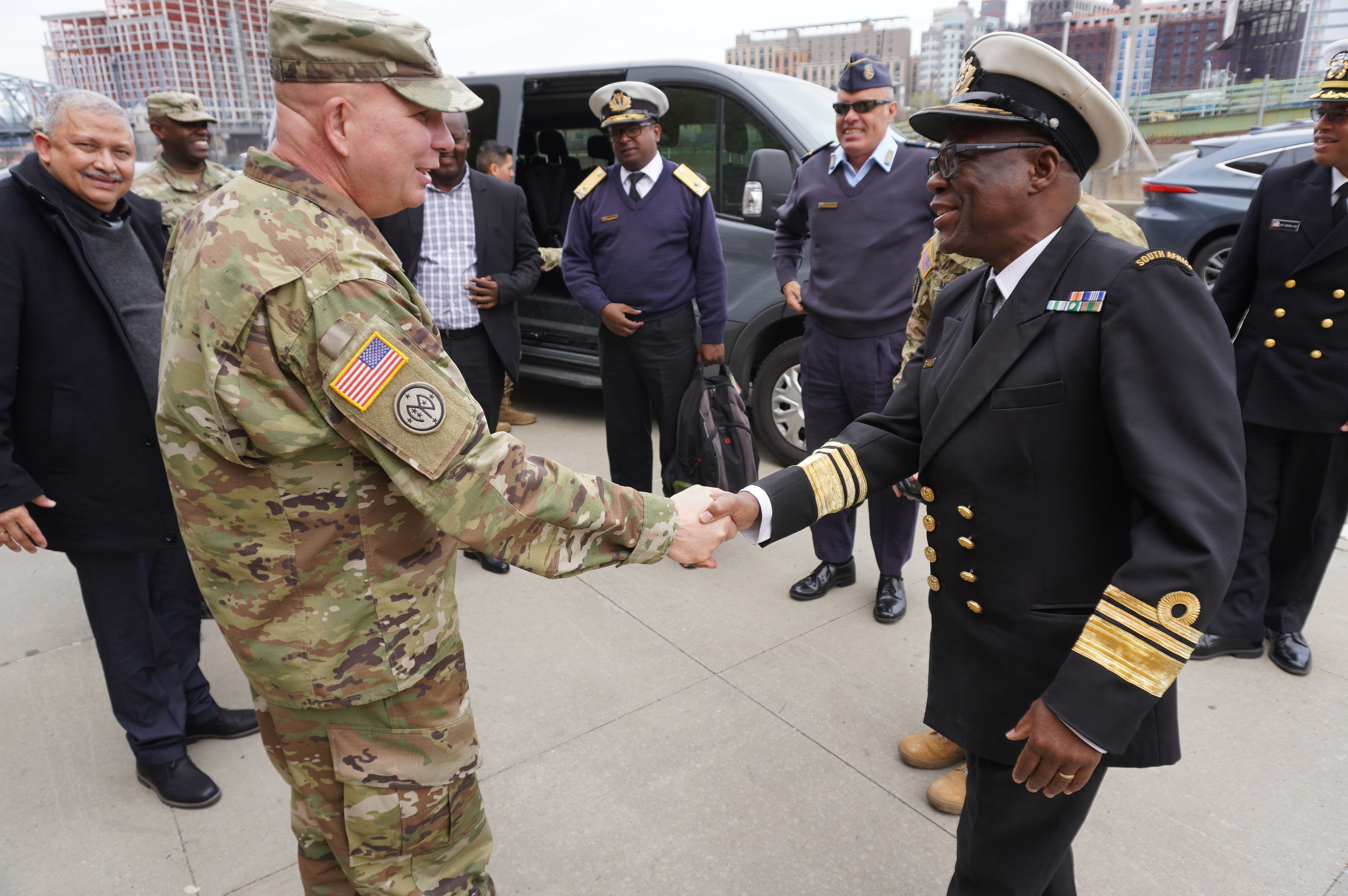
- Military career
- Allegiance: South Africa
- Branch: South African Navy
- Service years: 1992 –
- Rank: Vice Admiral
- Commands: Chief of Human Resources; Chief of Naval Staff; Director Naval Personnel
- Awards: iPhrothiya yeGolide PG iPhrothiya yeSiliva PS iPhrothiya yeBhronzi PB General Service Medal (South Africa) Tshumelo Ikatelaho (General Service Medal) Unitas (Unity) Medal Medalje vir Troue Diens (Medal for Loyal Service) Good Service Medal

Vice Admiral Asiel Kubu PS PB is a retired South African Navy officer who served as Chief of Human Resources for the South African National Defence Force.

He joined the Navy as a Midshipman at the South African Naval College in 1992 as one of the first black officers to attend the college. He previously served as Director of Naval Personnel and Chief of Naval Staff. He was promoted to vice admiral in 2019 and appointed Chief of Human Resources for the South African National Defence Force. He retired in March 2024.

== Awards and decorations ==
- iPhrothiya yeGolide (Golden Protea) (PG)
- iPhrothiya yeSiliva (Silver Protea) (PS)
- iPhrothiya yeBhronzi (Bronze Protea) (PB)
- General Service Medal (South Africa)
- Tshumelo Ikatelaho (General Service Medal)
- Unitas (Unity) Medal
- Medalje vir Troue Diens (Medal for Loyal Service) (30 Year Clasp)
- Medalje vir Troue Diens (Medal for Loyal Service) (20 Year Clasp)
- Good Service Medal (Bronze (10 Years))

Military offices
Preceded by Norman Yengeni	Chief of Human Resources; 2019 – 2024	Succeeded by Lungi Sitshongaye
Preceded by Robert W. Higgs	Chief of Naval Staff; 2017 – 2019	Succeeded by Gladys Mbulaheni
