= Davidson Masuku =

South African general and doctor (1940 - 2000)

Lieutenant General Davidson Themba Masuku SSAS MMM CStJ
- Born: 8 March 1940
- Died: 4 April 2000 (aged 60); Johannesburg, South Africa
- Spouse: Annie
- Relatives: Annie Sibukalomba Masuku
- Military career
- Allegiance: South Africa
- Branch: South African Military Health Service
- Rank: Lieutenant General
- Commands: Chief of the SAMHS
- Awards: Star of South Africa SSAS Military Merit Medal MMM Unitas (Unity) Medal Service Medal Venerable Order of Saint John KStJ

Lieutenant General Davidson Masuku SSAS MMM KStJ (8 March 1940 – 17 April 2000) was a South African military commander and physician. He joined Umkhonto weSizwe (MK), the military wing of the African National Congress, and served as its Chief of Health Services from 1993 to 1994, when MK was incorporated into the South African National Defence Force.

He commanded the South African Military Health Service, serving as Surgeon-General, from 1997 to 2000.

== Medical career ==
He was trained as a doctor in Russia and qualified in 1981 as a surgeon.

== Awards and decorations ==
- Star of South Africa (Silver) (SSAS)
- Military Merit Medal (MMM)
- Unitas (Unity) Medal
- Service Medal (Gold)
- Service Medal (Silver)
- Service Medal (Bronze)
- Venerable Order of Saint John (Gr II - Knight of Justice or Grace) (KStJ)

== See also ==
- List of South African military chiefs
- South African Military Health Service

Military offices
| Preceded by Daniel Knobel | Chief of the South African Military Health Service; 1997 – 2000 | Succeeded by Jurinus Janse van Rensburg |
