= Nomathemba =

Nomathemba (masculine: Themba) is a feminine given name derived from the Nguni word themba, meaning "faith". Notable people with the name include:

- Nomathemba Maseko-Jele (born 1964), South African politician;
- Nomathemba Mokgethi, South African politician;
- Nomathemba Ntsibande (born 1986), South African soccer player.
