= Lawrence Mbatha =

South African general

Lieutenant General Lawrence Khulekani Mbatha
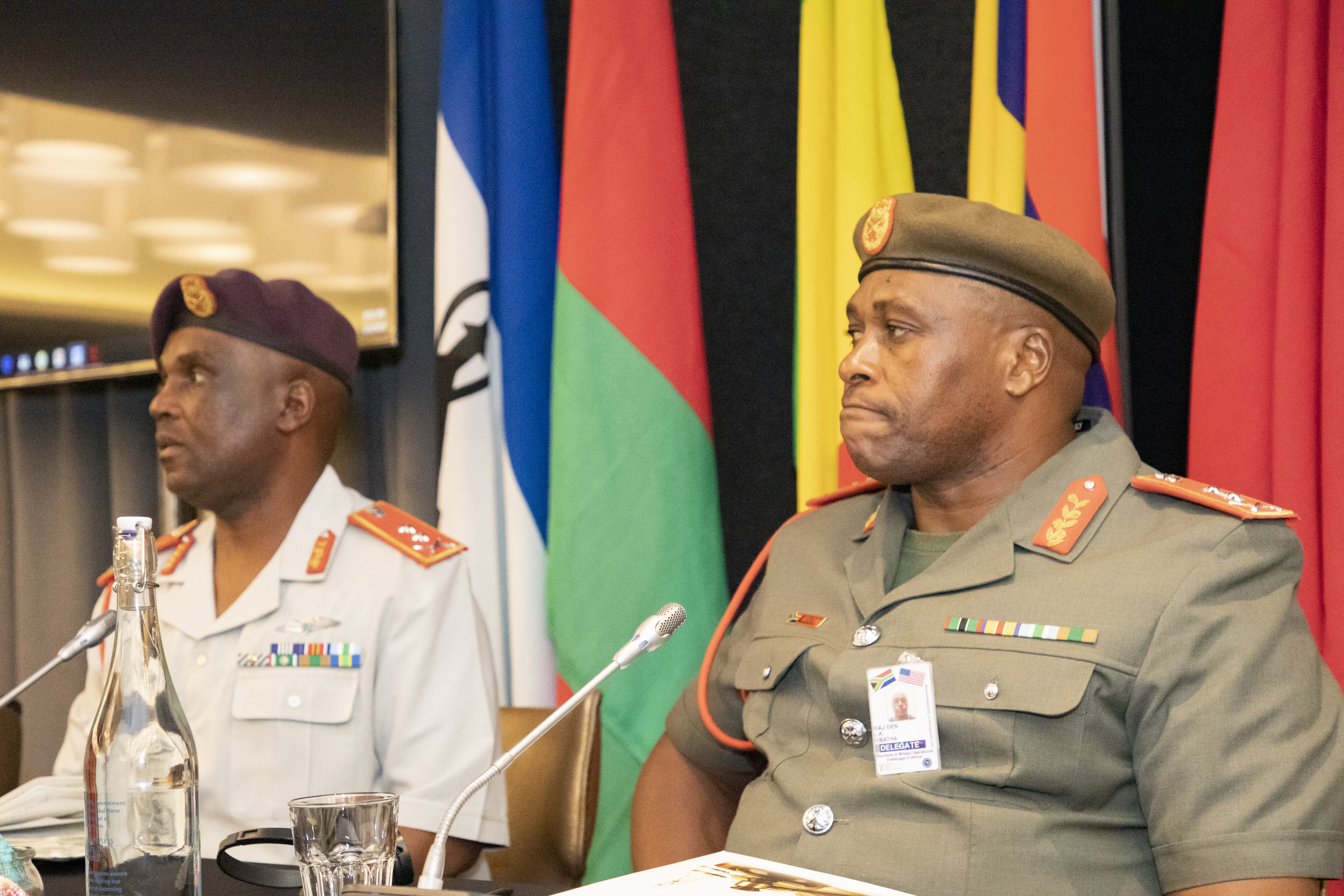
- Born: 1968 (age 57–58); Kimberly, Northern Cape
- Military career
- Allegiance: South Africa
- Branch: South African Army
- Rank: Lieutenant general
- Unit: 3 SA Infantry Battalion
- Commands: Chief of the South African Army; GOC South African National Defence Force Training Command; Commandant SA Military Academy; OC SA Army Gymnasium; OC ASB Johannesburg
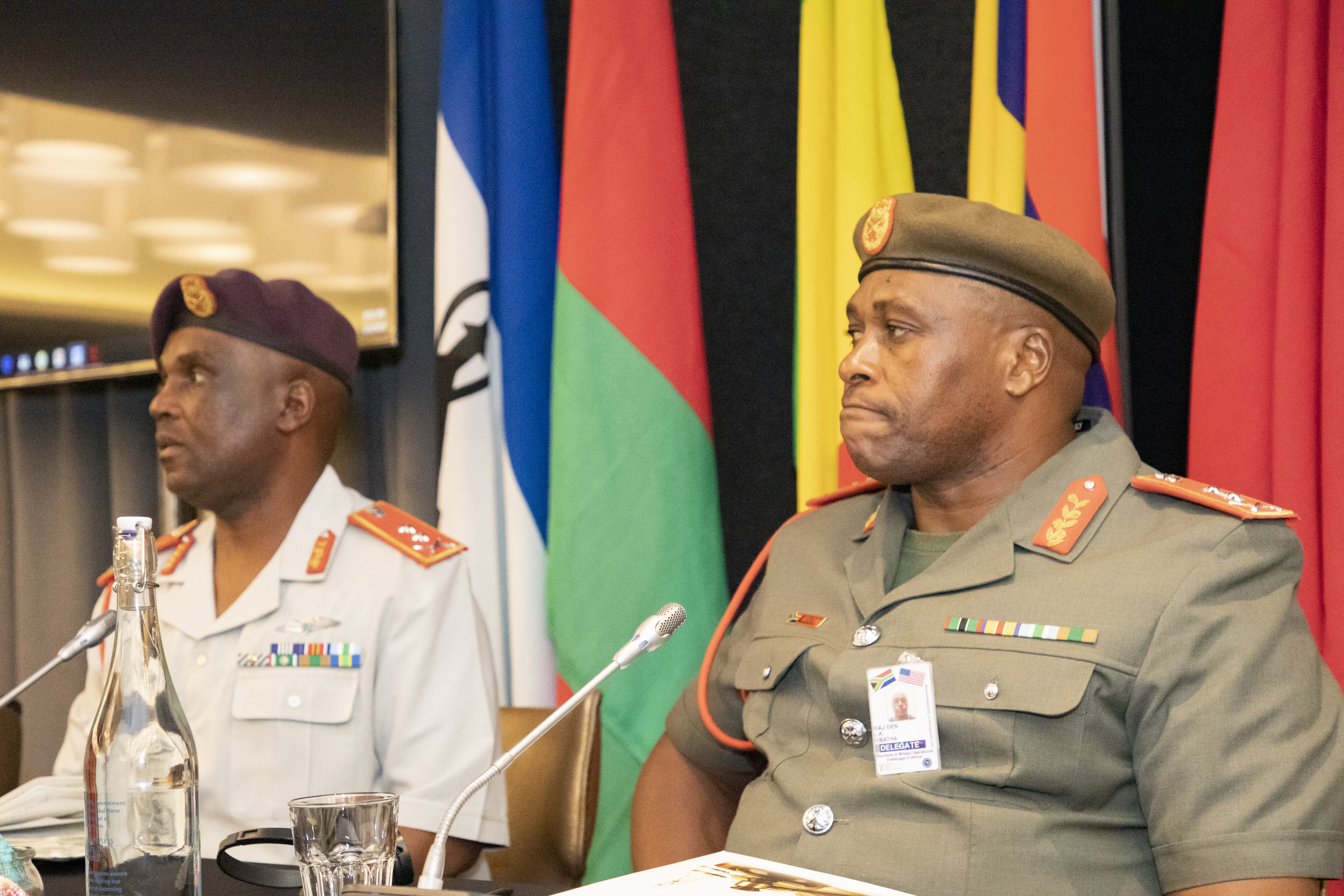
- Awards: (Note: This list (As of 29 March 2023) was taken from )

Lawrence Mbatha is the current chief of the South African Army. He was appointed to this position in April 2020. Before being appointed Chief of the Army he was the general officer commanding of the South African National Defence Force Training Command; earlier, he was the 19th commandant of the South African Military Academy.

== Military career ==
He joined Umkhonto we Sizwe in 1984 and completed courses in Angola and Zimbabwe.

He integrated into the South African National Defence Force in 1994 and served as a company commander in the 3 SA Infantry Battalion.

He was promoted to colonel in 2003. In 2003 he served as officer commanding of the General Support Base in Johannesburg, followed by an appointment as principal staff officer to the chief of the Army (2007) before serving as officer commanding of the South African Army Gymnasium in 2011. During this time he completed the British Army Staff Course. He was promoted to brigadier general in 2012. Commandant of the South African Military Academy in 2012–2018. GOC Training Command at Human Resources Division from 2018 to 2020.

== Awards ==
General Mbatha wears the following medals:

- Operational Medal for Southern Africa
- South Africa Service Medal
- Unitas (Unity) Medal
- Good Service Medal (Bronze (10 Years))

== Notes ==
Military offices
Preceded by Thabiso Mokhosi	Chief of the Army; 2020–	Incumbent
Preceded by Gordon Yekelo	GOC Training Command; 2017–2020	Succeeded by Xolani Mankayi
Preceded by Lindile Yam	Commandant of the Military Academy; 2012–2017	Succeeded by Gerald Pharo
