= Rudzani Maphwanya =

South African Army officer (born 1960)

General Rudzani Maphwanya SM MMM
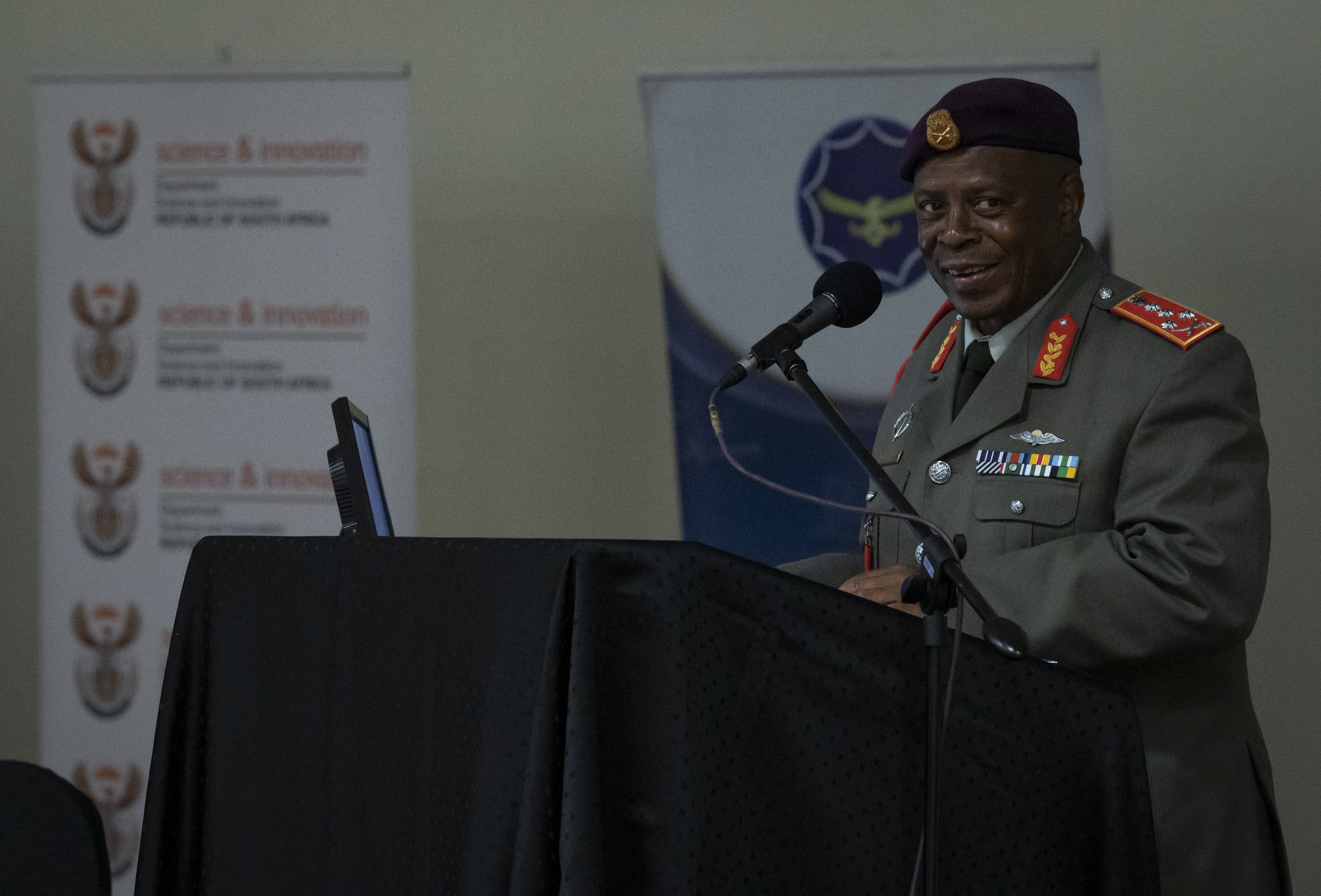
- Born: 23 November 1960 (age 65)
- Spouse: Masindi Mulayo Maphwanya
- Military career
- Allegiance: South Africa
- Branch: South African Army uMkhonto we Sizwe
- Service years: 1978–present
- Rank: General
- Unit: Special Forces Brigade
- Commands: Chief of the South African National Defence Force; Chief Joint Operations; GOC Infantry Formation (2016–2019); GOC Special Forces Brigade (2006–2015)
- Awards: Southern Cross Medal SM Military Merit Medal MMM South Africa Service Medal Tshumelo Ikatelaho (General Service Medal) Unitas (Unity) Medal Medalje vir Troue Diens (Medal for Loyal Service) Good Service Medal Service Medal Order of Military Merit

General Rudzani Maphwanya SM MMM (born 23 November 1960) is a South African military commander who served as Chief of Joint Operations from 2019 till May 2021. He was appointed Chief of the South African National Defence Force (SANDF) on 1 June 2021.

== Military career ==
Maphwanya served in the uMkhonto we Sizwe (MK) in Angola and integrated into the SANDF in 1994. He served as SO1 Operations, SSO Operations Special Forces Brigade, CoS Special Forces Brigade, GOC SA Army Infantry Formation, Chief Joint Operations Division. He was appointed as the SANDF Chief of Joint Operations on 1 November 2019.

== Controversies ==
General Rudzani Maphangwa has submitted his report about his trip to Iran. Maphwanya has faced controversy for public statements expressing support for Hamas and Hezbollah in the context of the Israeli–Palestinian conflict. During his visit to Iran in August 2025, Maphwanya publicly endorsed the actions of the groups against Israel. Hamas and Hezbollah are designated as terrorist organizations by a number of countries. His comments were made following the October 7, 2023 Hamas-led attack on Israel, and drew mixed reactions.

== Awards and decorations ==
=== Medals ===
- Southern Cross Medal (1975) (SM)
- Military Merit Medal (MMM)
- South Africa Service Medal (Umkonto we Sizwe)
- Tshumelo Ikatelaho (General Service Medal)
- Unitas (Unity) Medal
- Medalje vir Troue Diens (Medal for Loyal Service) (30 Year Clasp)
- Good Service Medal (Silver (20 Years))
- Service Medal (Bronze) (Umkonto we Sizwe)
- Order of Military Merit (Grand Officer - Grande-Oficial) (Brazil)

=== Military Qualifications ===
SA Special Forces Operator's Badge (Qualification) Black on Thatch beige, Embossed. Dagger enclosed with a laurel wreath (Note: This was an Honorary award based on his posting)	Paratrooper Basic (Qualification) Basic, Static Line. Black on Thatch beige, Embossed. Small Black wings

== Academic Qualifications ==
1993
Junior Command and Staff Course at the Zimbabwe Staff College
1994
Bachelor of Commerce Degree at the University of the North
2000
Senior Command and Staff Course at the Kenyan Staff College
2003
Certificate in Total Quality Management at the University of South Africa (UNISA)
2004
Executive National Security Programme at the South African National Defence College
2005
Strategic Management Programme at the University of Pretoria
2012
Post Graduate Diploma in Security Management at the University of the Witwatersrand (WITS)
2015
Master of Management degree at the University of the Witwatersrand (WITS)

== Notes ==
Military offices
Preceded by Solly Shoke	Chief of the SANDF; 2021–present	Incumbent
Preceded by Barney Hlatswayo	Chief of Joint Operations; 2019–2021	Succeeded by Siphiwe Sangweni
Preceded by Lindile Yam	GOC Infantry Formation; 2016–2019	Succeeded by Njabulo Dube
Preceded by Krubert Nel	GOC Special Forces; 2006–2015	Succeeded by Steve Maloma
Preceded by Renier Coetzee	Chief of Staff Special Forces; 2003–2006	Unknown
