= Gladys Mbulaheni =

South African Naval officer

- Born: December 13, 1973 (age 52); Soweto
- Military career
- Allegiance: South Africa
- Branch: South African Navy
- Rank: Rear Admiral
- Commands: Deputy Chief Human Resource since 2024 September

Gladys Mbulaheni is a South African Naval officer, serving as the Deputy Chief Human Resources from 1 September 2024.

She is the first woman to hold the rank of Rear Admiral in the South African Navy.

== Qualifications ==
- BA degree in government administration and development
- Postgraduate diploma in security studies
- Pursuing an MBA degree

Military offices
Preceded by Asiel Kubu	Chief of Naval Staff; 2020 – September 2024	Incumbent
Preceded by	Director of HR Maintenance; 2010 – 2020	Succeeded by
Preceded by	Deputy Chief Human Resources; September 2024 –	Succeeded by
