= Lawrence Smith (general) =

Major General Lawrence Reginald Smith SM MMM SAStC
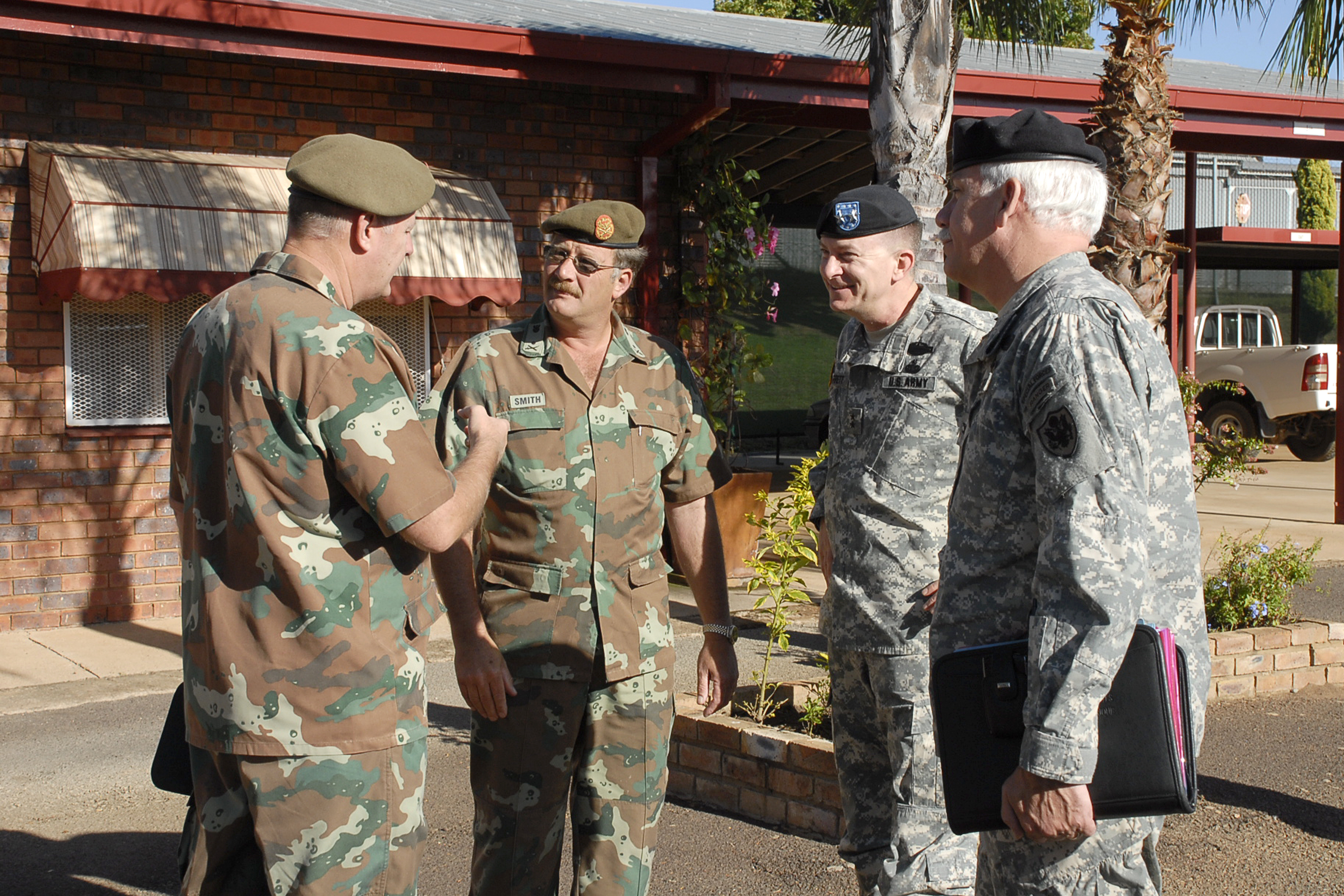
- Smith (2nd from left) as a Brigadier General
- Military career
- Allegiance: South Africa
- Branch: South African Army
- Service years: 1976–present
- Rank: Major General
- Commands: Deputy Chief South African Army; GOC 43 SA Brigade; Chief of Staff 43 SA Bde
- Awards: Southern Cross Medal SM Military Merit Medal MMM Pro Patria Medal Southern Africa Medal General Service Medal (South Africa) Mentioned in Dispatches - Okhankanyiweyo MID Tshumelo Ikatelaho (General Service Medal) Unitas (Unity) Medal Medalje vir Troue Diens (Medal for Loyal Service) Good Service Medal United Nations Medal

Lawrence Reginald Smith SM MMM SAStC is a General Officer in the South African Army. General Smith completed the South African Army Command and Staff Duties Course at the South African Army College, Pretoria over the period January 1994 to November 1995. Smith graduated from the US Army Command and General Staff College in Leavenworth, Kansas, in 1997 and the People's Liberation Army of China, National Defense College, Beijing, in 2008.

== Military career ==
General Smith was appointed to the post of Deputy Chief of the South African Army on 1 January 2015, taking over from Maj Gen Les Rudman.

Smith completed National Service in 1976 in the SADF. He served on the South West African/Namibian border and commanded Sector 5 in the Democratic Republic of Congo (DRC) in 2003 and 2004.

He has been the designated SADC Standby Force Military Component Commander and was in command of it during Exercise Golfinho in 2009. He was also Head of the African Union Standby Force during its final Combat Readiness Exercise (Amani Africa) in November 2010. More recently he was involved in the preparation of the ACIRC (African Capacity for Immediate Response to Crises) Force within the SANDF as well as at African Union level as the Deputy Exercise Director of Exercise UTULIVU AFRICA 2014.

Prior to being named Deputy Chief of the South African Army, Smith was General Officer Commanding 43 South African Brigade headquarters.

== Honours and awards ==
- Southern Cross Medal (1975) (SM)
- Military Merit Medal (MMM)
- Pro Patria Medal
- Southern Africa Medal
- General Service Medal (South Africa)
- Mentioned in Dispatches - Okhankanyiweyo (MID)
- Tshumelo Ikatelaho (General Service Medal) (Peace Support clasp)
- Unitas (Unity) Medal
- Medalje vir Troue Diens (Medal for Loyal Service) (30 Year Clasp)
- Good Service Medal (Silver (20 Years))
- Good Service Medal (Bronze (10 Years))
- United Nations Medal (ONUB - Burundi) (United Nations)
- United Nations Medal (MONUC - DRC) (United Nations)

Military offices
Preceded by Les Rudman	Deputy Chief SA Army; 2015–2018	Succeeded by Mannetjies de Goede
Preceded by Duma Mdutyana	GOC 43 SA Brigade c. 2005–2014	Succeeded by Xolani Mankayi
