= Martyn Trainor =

South African naval officer (born 1944)

Vice Admiral Martyn Trainor SD & Bar SM MMM SAN (Rtd)
- Born: 13 January 1944 (age 82); Cape Town
- Relatives: Tut Trainor (father)
- Military career
- Allegiance: South Africa
- Branch: South African Navy
- Service years: 1962–2004
- Rank: Vice Admiral
- Nickname: Spook
- Commands: Chief of Corporate Staff; Chief of Naval Staff; OC Naval Staff College; OC SAS Saldanha
- Awards: Southern Cross Decoration SD & Bar Southern Cross Medal SM Military Merit Medal MMM General Service Medal (South Africa) Unitas (Unity) Medal Good Service Medal Order of the Cloud and Banner ORB

Vice Admiral Martyn Trainor SD & Bar SM MMM SAN (Rtd) (born 13 January 1944) is a retired South African Navy Officer, who served as Chief of Corporate Staff of the South African National Defence Force.

== Naval career ==
He matriculated from Diocesan College and joined the Navy in 1962 and attended the South African Military Academy, graduating in 1965. He served on Frigates and Minesweepers before volunteering for the Submarine service.

He commanded Naval Base Durban and the Naval Staff College. He was promoted to Commodore in 1989 and appointed Chief of Naval Staff Personnel. On 1 September 1992 he was promoted to rear admiral and appointed Chief of Naval Staff and Chief of Naval Support. and Chief of Fleet Staff Personnel.

He was appointed Chief of Corporate Staff on 1 November 2000 and promoted to vice admiral. He retired from the Navy in 2004.

== Awards and decorations ==
- Southern Cross Decoration (SD & Bar)
- Southern Cross Medal (1975) (SM)
- Military Merit Medal (MMM)
- General Service Medal (South Africa)
- Unitas (Unity) Medal
- Good Service Medal (Gold (30 Years))
- Good Service Medal (Silver (20 Years))
- Good Service Medal (Bronze (10 Years))
- Order of the Cloud and Banner (4^{th} Grade - with Special Cravat) (ORB) (Taiwan)

Military offices
New title	Chief of Corporate Staff; 2000–2004	Succeeded by Lt Gen Themba Matanzima
Preceded by R Adm Robert Simpson-Anderson	Chief of Naval Support; 1992–2000	Succeeded by R Adm Refiloe Johannes Mudimu
Preceded by Cdre Raymond Eberlein	Chief of Naval Staff Personnel –1992	Succeeded by Cdre Steve van H. du Toit
