= Themba Nkabinde =

South African Army General Officer

Themba Michael Nkabinde
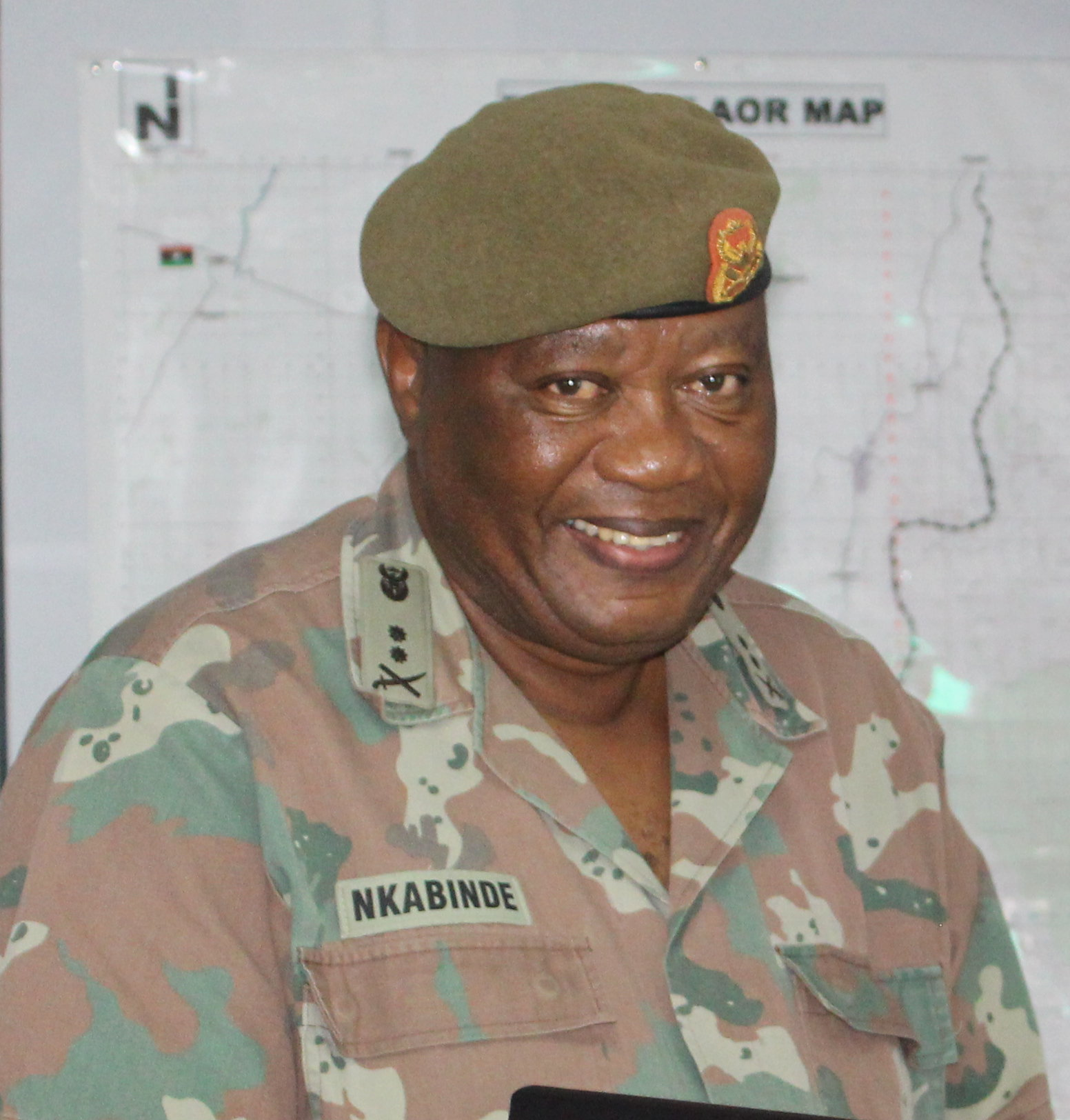
- Born: 1956 (age 69–70)
- Spouse: Busisiwe
- Military career
- Allegiance: South Africa
- Branch: South African Army
- Rank: Lieutenant General
- Commands: South African Army Infantry Formation; Camp Commander Umkhonto We Sizwe

Lieutenant General Themba Nkabinde is a South African Army General Officer, currently serving as Chief Human Resources.

== Military career ==
He joined Umkhonto we Sizwe (MK) in 1977 and he left South Africa for training in Angola.

From 1991 to 1992 he was the deputy military attache in Tanzania and completed a senior command and staff course in India. In 1994 he integrated into the SANDF and served as the senior staff officer Africa under the director operations at Chief of Joint Operations and then as the deputy chief director Army Force Structure.

He became the commanding officer of the Infantry Formation on 1 April 2003.

He handed over command as General Officer Commanding, South African Army Infantry Formation on 2 March 2012 to Maj Gen Lindile Yam.

Military offices
Preceded by Derrick Mgwebi	Chief of Human Resources; 2012 – 2014	Succeeded by Norman Yengeni
Preceded by Derrick Mgwebi	GOC SA Army Infantry Fmn; 1 April 2003 – 02 March 2012	Succeeded by Lindile Yam
