= Vusumuzi Masondo =

South African military commander (born 1957)

Lieutenant general Vusumuzi Ramakala Masondo MMM
- Born: 21 December 1957 (age 68); Umtata, Cape Province, Union of South Africa
- Relatives: Lieutenant General Andrew Masondo DMG MMM (father)
- Military career
- Allegiance: Transkei; South Africa
- Branch: Transkei Defence Force; South African Army
- Service years: 1979–2018
- Rank: Lieutenant general
- Commands: Chief of the South African Army (2011–2016); Chief of Corporate Staff; OC 2nd Transkei Infantry Battalion
- Awards: Military Merit Medal MMM Operational Medal for Southern Africa South Africa Service Medal Unitas (Unity) Medal Medalje vir Troue Diens (Medal for Loyal Service) Good Service Medal Service Medal

Lieutenant General Vusumuzi Masondo MMM is a South African military commander.

He was born in Umtata on 21 December 1957. After graduating from University in 1978, he joined the Transkei Defence Force in 1979, undergoing training in Lohatla and Walvis Bay. He served in various capacities in the Transkei Forces until its integration into the South African National Defence Force in 1994.

He holds a Certificate in Defence Management from the University of the Witwatersrand, a Certificate in Labour Relations from the University of Pretoria and a BComm degree. He is currently studying towards a BComm Honours degree from the University of South Africa. Masondo is married with three children.

== Military career ==
Masondo underwent his basic military training in the 21st Infantry Battalion of the SADF in 1978-79 and did advanced Armoured warfare and officer training in the former SWATF Military Academy in Walvis Bay in 1984. He served for a time as a Signals Officer in the SWATF and then in the Transkei Defence Forces and rose to be the Colonel Commanding of the 2nd Transkei Infantry Battalion by 1993, in which capacity he was deployed to oversee the election process in the city of Durban and surrounding townships.

On 1 October 2011 he was appointed chief of the South African Army and promoted to lieutenant general. In 2016 he was appointed as chief of corporate staff.

== After integration ==
Before integration into the SA National Defence Force in 1994, he served on the Joint Military Coordinating Council (JMCC) as the co-chairperson of the Inspection Work Logistics Command in 1995. In 1996, he was transferred to 3 Electronic Workshop SACS at Wonderboom Military Base, where he was appointed as the personnel officer of the unit. After serving as a personnel officer for nearly a year, he was transferred to the SA Army Signal Formation Headquarters in 1997 and appointed as staff officer of personnel.

On 1 January 1999 until 31 May 2002, he was appointed as staff officer class at the SA Army Armour Formation and was promoted to the rank of lieutenant colonel.

He was appointed as senior staff officer in charge of staffing at the SA Army Headquarters on 1 June 2002 and promoted to the rank of colonel. On 1 January 2003, he was transferred to the Human Resource Support Centre (Directorate Personnel Maintenance). where he was appointed as senior staff officer in charge of remuneration.

On 1 May 2004, Masondo was appointed as director of corporate communication and promoted to the rank of brigadier general. He served in that post for only one month and on 1 June 2004 was appointed as personnel staff officer to the then chief of the SA National Defence Force, General Siphiwe Nyanda. On 1 March 2006, he was appointed as acting director of human resource maintenance, a post in which he was confirmed as director on 1 March 2006. On 1 December 2007, Masondo was promoted to the rank of major general and appointed as chief of army force preparation.

== See also ==
- List of South African military chiefs

== Awards and decorations ==
- Military Merit Medal (MMM)
- Operational Medal for Southern Africa
- South Africa Service Medal
- Unitas (Unity) Medal
- Medalje vir Troue Diens (Medal for Loyal Service) (30 Year Clasp)
- Good Service Medal (Silver (20 Years))
- Service Medal (Bronze)

Military offices
Preceded by Vejaynand Ramlakan	Chief of Corporate Staff; 2016–2019	Succeeded by Lindile Yam
Preceded by Solly Shoke	Chief of the South African Army; 2011–2016	Succeeded by Lindile Yam
Preceded by Derrick Mgwebi	CD Force Preparation SA Army; 2007–2011	Succeeded by Spinks Nobanda
