= Mannetjies de Goede =

Major General Michal J. de Goede SD & Bar SM MMM
- Born: Cape Town
- Military career
- Allegiance: ZAF
- Branch: South African Army
- Rank: Major General
- Nickname: Mannetjies
- Unit: 1 Parachute Battalion
- Commands: Deputy Chief of the South African Army; Director: Area Defence of the Infantry Formation; CoS 43 HQ SA Brigade; OC 2 South African Infantry Battalion
- Awards: Southern Cross Decoration SD & Bar Southern Cross Medal SM Military Merit Medal MMM Pro Patria Medal Southern Africa Medal General Service Medal (South Africa) Tshumelo Ikatelaho (General Service Medal) Unitas (Unity) Medal Medalje vir Troue Diens (Medal for Loyal Service) Good Service Medal

M.J. "Mannetjies" de Goede SD & Bar SM MMM is a South African Army officer, who served as Acting Chief of the Army.

In June 2012 he was promoted to brigadier general and appointed Director Area Defence at the South African Army Infantry Formation.

== Awards ==
- Southern Cross Decoration (SD & Bar)
- Southern Cross Medal (1975) (SM)
- Military Merit Medal (MMM)
- Pro Patria Medal
- Southern Africa Medal
- General Service Medal (South Africa)
- Tshumelo Ikatelaho (General Service Medal)
- Unitas (Unity) Medal
- Medalje vir Troue Diens (Medal for Loyal Service) (40 Year Clasp)
- Good Service Medal (Gold (30 Years))
- Good Service Medal (Silver (20 Years))
- Good Service Medal (Bronze (10 Years))

Military offices
Preceded by Lawrence Smith	Deputy Chief SA Army (Acting); 2018–	Succeeded by Maj Gen Michael Ramantswana
Unknown	Director: Area Defence Infantry Formation; 2012– incumbent	Succeeded by Brig Gen Bayanda Mkula
