= Lindile Yam =

South African Army officer

Lieutenant General Lindile Yam CLS MMS
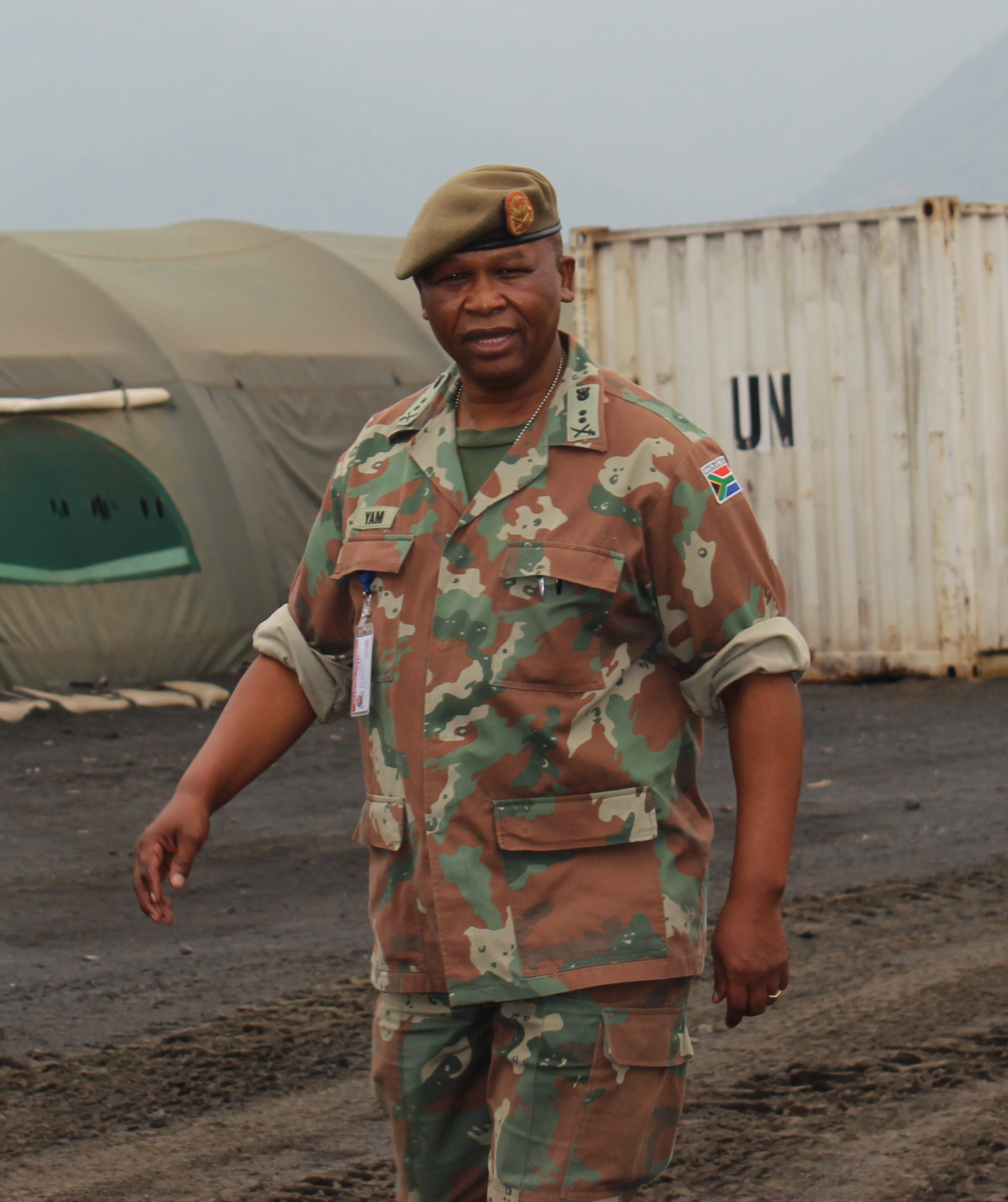
- Yam during a visit to the FIB in the DRC during 2014
- Born: 8 August 1960 (age 66); East London, South Africa
- Military career
- Allegiance: South Africa
- Branch: South African Army
- Service years: 1981–2022
- Rank: Lieutenant General
- Service number: 94654191PE
- Unit: 13 SA Infantry Battalion
- Commands: South African Military Academy; South African Army Infantry Formation; South African Army
- Awards: Conspicuous Leadership Star CLS Merit Medal MMS Operational Medal for Southern Africa South Africa Service Medal Unitas (Unity) Medal Medalje vir Troue Diens (Medal for Loyal Service) Good Service Medal Service Medal Order of Military Merit

Lindile Yam CLS MMS (born 8 August 1960) is the former SANDF Chief of staff and former Chief of the South African Army.

== Career ==
He joined Umkhonto we Sizwe, the military wing of the ANC, in 1981 and became part of the South African National Defence Force in 1994 when all the forces were integrated.

He served as Officer Commanding of 13 South African Infantry Battalion from November 1994 to November 1997.

He attended the Royal College of Defence Studies in 1995 for a Global Security Strategy Course.

He served as the 18th Commandant of the South African Military Academy from 2009 to 2011.

He was promoted to major general and was appointed as the 3rd GOC South African Army Infantry Formation on 1 November 2011. He formally took over command on 2 March 2012 at a parade at the SA Army College in Thaba Tshwane.

He was promoted to lieutenant general and assumed command of the South African Army in January 2016. In November 2019 he was appointed SANDF chief of staff. He left the SANDF in August 2022.

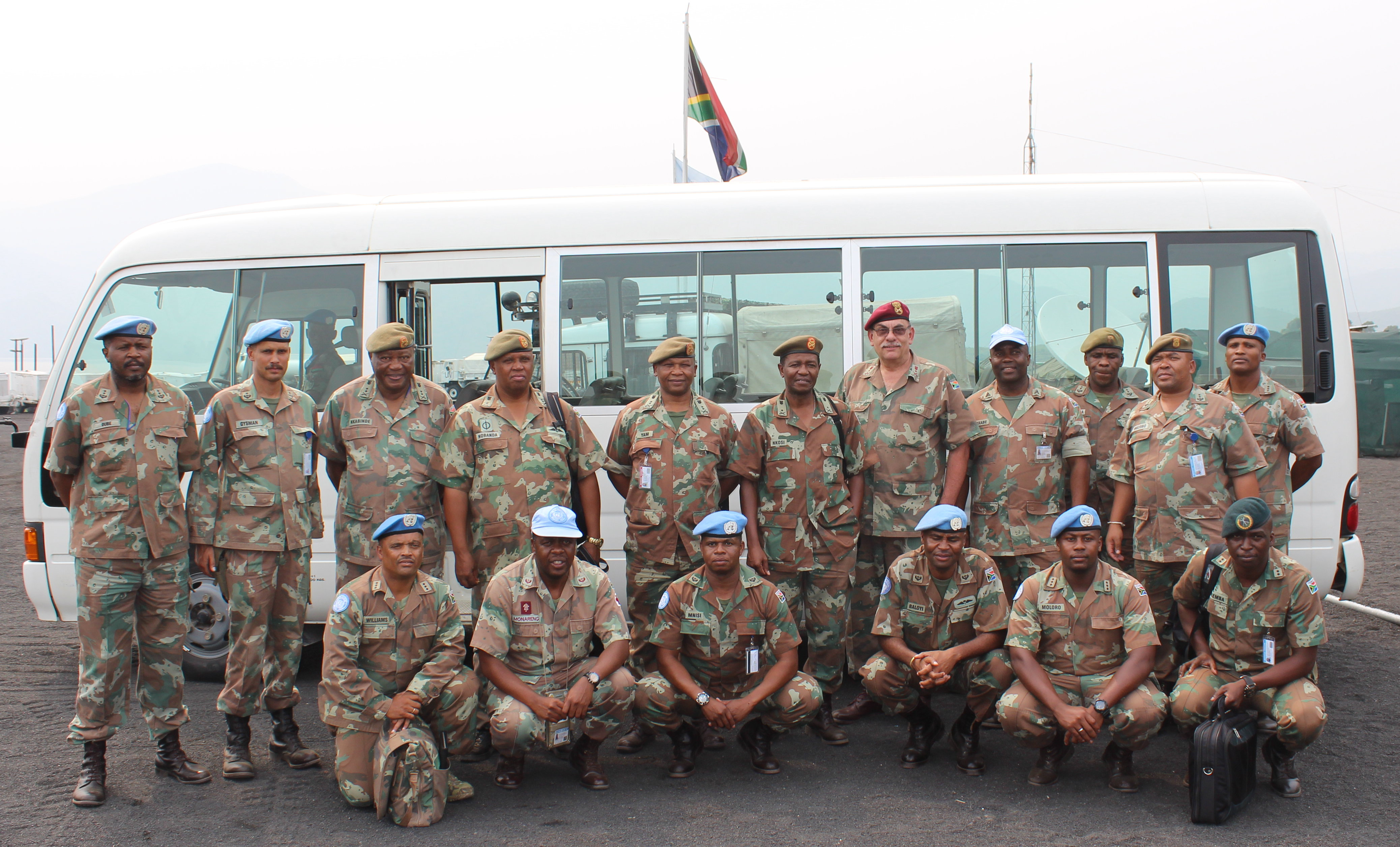
SANDF VIP Visit FIB DRC 2014.

== Awards and decorations ==
- Conspicuous Leadership Star (CLS)
- Merit Medal (Silver) (MMS)
- Operational Medal for Southern Africa
- South Africa Service Medal
- Unitas (Unity) Medal
- Medalje vir Troue Diens (Medal for Loyal Service) (30 Year Clasp)
- Good Service Medal (Silver (20 Years))
- Service Medal (Bronze)
- Order of Military Merit (Grand Officer - Grande-Oficial)

Military offices
Preceded by Lt Gen Vusumuzi Masondo	Chief of Staff SANDF; 2019–2022	Succeeded by Lt Gen Michael Ramantswana
Preceded by Lt Gen Vusumuzi Masondo	Chief of the South African Army; 2016–2019	Succeeded by Lt Gen Thabiso Mokhosi
Preceded by Maj Gen Themba Nkabinde	GOC South African Army Infantry Formation; 2012–2016	Succeeded by Maj Gen Rudzani Maphwanya
Preceded by R Adm (JG) Derek Christian	Commandant of the South African Military Academy; 2009–2011	Succeeded by Brig Gen Lawrence Mbatha
