= Raymond Eberlein =

South African Navy admiral

Rear Admiral Raymond Eberlein SD SM MMM
- Born: Cape Town
- Military career
- Allegiance: South Africa
- Branch: South African Navy
- Service years: 1957–1993
- Rank: Rear Admiral
- Nickname: Ray
- Commands: OC SADF COLET; CNS Personnel; CDM Provisioning
- Awards: Southern Cross Decoration SD Southern Cross Medal SM Military Merit Medal MMM Pro Patria Medal Good Service Medal Permanent Force Good Service Medal
- Other work: Central Drug Authority

Rear Admiral Raymond Eberlein SD SM MMM was a retired Rear Admiral in the South African Navy, who served as Chief Director Manpower Provisioning at the Personnel Division in the SADF.

He joined the Navy in 1957 and studied at the Military Academy. As a naval lieutenant he was appointed as Commander SAS SIMONSBERG from 1962. He graduated with a bachelor's degree in 1960. He served at sea and in shore. He commanded the College of Education and Training. As a commodore at Navy HQ, he served as Chief of Naval Staff Personnel from 1986 to 1988. His final post with promotion to Rear Admiral was as Chief Director Manpower Provisioning from 1988. He retired in 1993.

== Honours and awards ==
- Southern Cross Decoration (SD)
- Southern Cross Medal (1975) (SM)
- Military Merit Medal (MMM)
- Pro Patria Medal
- Good Service Medal (Gold (30 Years))
- Good Service Medal (Silver (20 Years))
- Permanent Force Good Service Medal

Military offices
Preceded by Phil Pretorius	Chief Director Manpower Provisioning; 1988–1993	Unknown
Preceded by	Chief of Naval Staff Personnel; 1986–1988	Succeeded by Martyn Trainor
Preceded by Evert de Munnik	OC COLET; 1978–1979	Succeeded by MJ Maritz
