= Solly Shoke =

South African Army officer (born 1956)

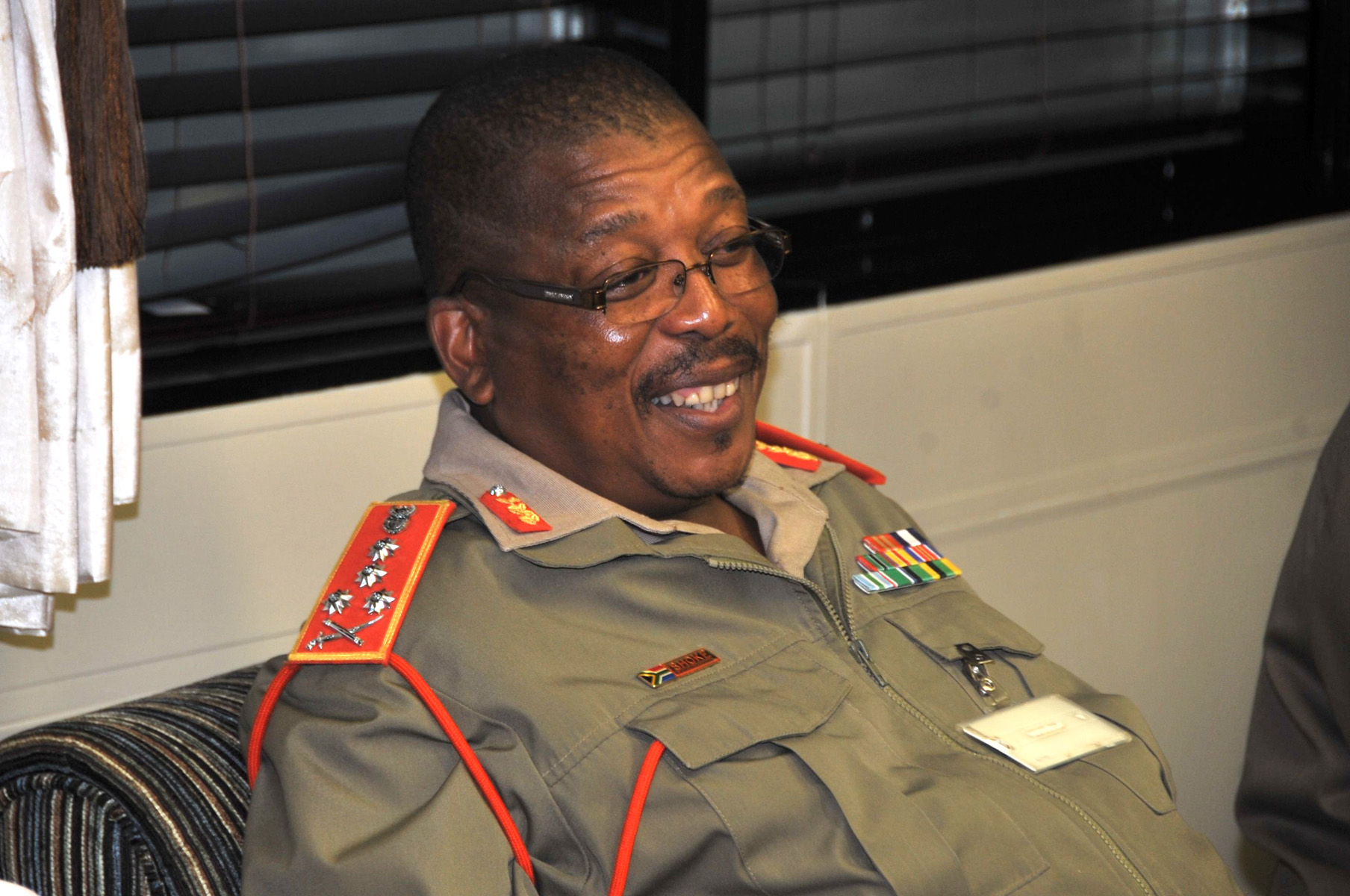
- Born: 15 August 1956 (age 70); Johannesburg, South Africa
- Military career
- Allegiance: South Africa
- Branch: South African Army uMkhonto we Sizwe
- Service years: 1970s–2021
- Rank: General (South African Army); Field commander (uMkhonto we Sizwe)
- Unit: G5 Unit uMkhonto we Sizwe
- Commands: Chief of the South African National Defence Force (2011–2021); Chief of the Army (2004–11)
- Conflicts: Operation Boleas
- Awards: Order of Mendi for Bravery OMBG Star for Bravery SBS Merit Medal MMS Operational Medal for Southern Africa South Africa Service Medal Tshumelo Ikatelaho (General Service Medal) Maluti Clasp Unitas (Unity) Medal Medalje vir Troue Diens (Medal for Loyal Service) Service Medal Order of Military Merit

General Solly Zacharia Shoke, OMBG, SBS, MMS, OMS (born 15 August 1956) is a South African military commander. He joined uMkhonto we Sizwe (MK), the military wing of the African National Congress, in the 1970s, and served as a field commander fighting against the South African government in the 1980s. He transferred to the South African National Defence Force (SANDF) when MK was incorporated into it in 1994, and served as Chief of the South African National Defence Force 2011 to 30 May 2021.

== Military career ==
Shoke received his education at Orlando High School, Orlando Township, in Johannesburg. Other academic qualifications include a Diploma in Human Resources Management from Damelin, a Certificate in Defence Management from the University of the Witwatersrand and a Certificate in Personnel Management from IPM. Shoke joined Umkhonto we Sizwe, the military wing of the African National Congress (ANC), in the 1970s. In the 1980s he served as field commander during the liberation struggle against the South African government. He obtained his military training in Angola and completed the Brigade Commanders Course in the USSR. He became part of the underground leadership of Operation Vula in 1988. Between 1993 and 1994, Shoke followed an Intermediate Staff Course in Zimbabwe. In 1994 he was appointed as Director Personnel Planning of the South African Army.

In 1998, Shoke commanded the South African Development Community forces during Operation Boleas in Lesotho. He was the Director Personnel Acquisition from January 1999 to October 2000, when he was promoted to the rank of major general as the Chief Director Human Resources Support. He was promoted to Chief of the Army in 2004, and became Chief of the South African National Defence Force in May 2011.

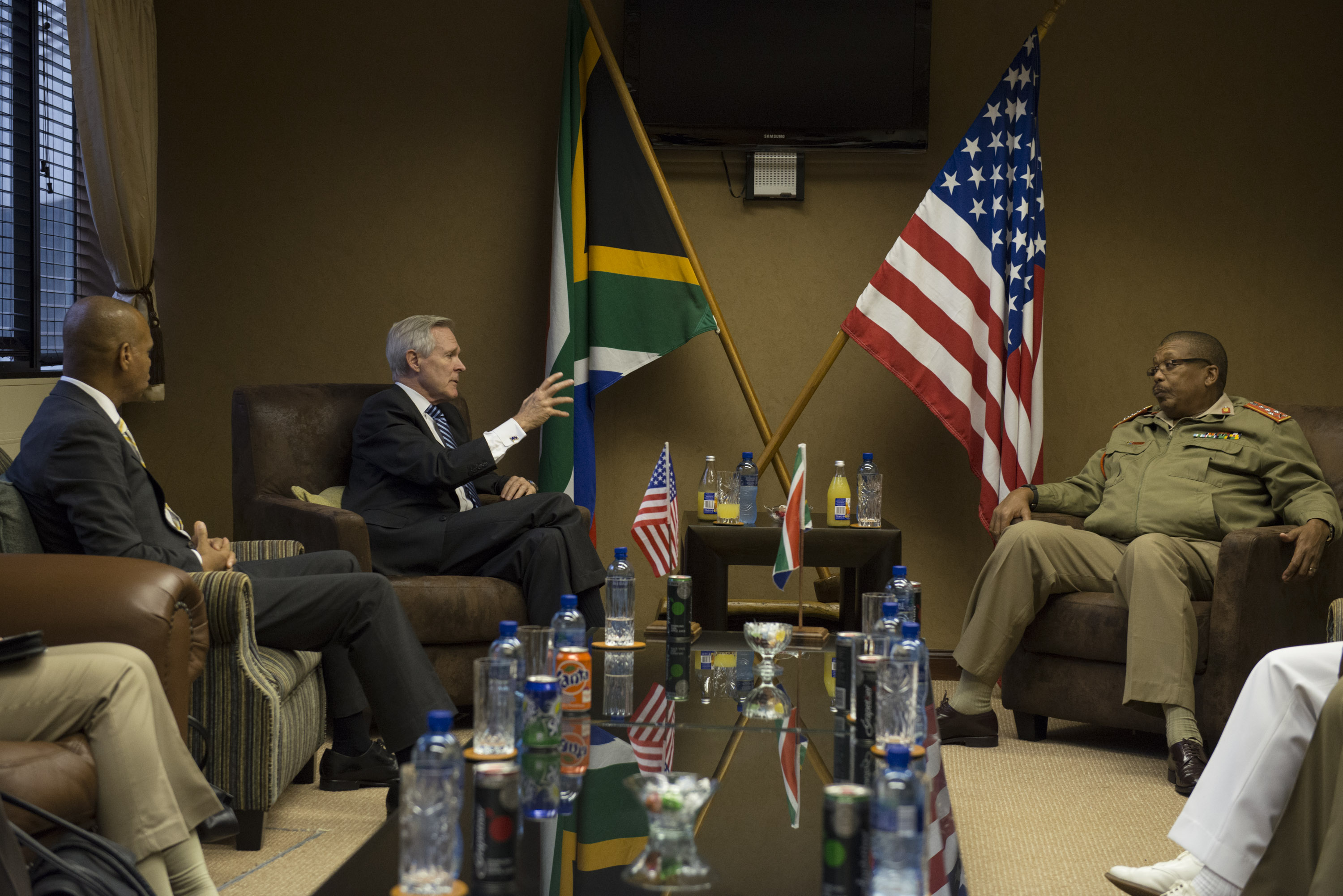
Shoke meeting with United States Secretary of the Navy, Ray Mabus

== Honours and awards ==
- Order of Mendi for Bravery (Gold) (OMBG) Shoke was awarded the Order of Mendi for Bravery for his work in the G5 unit of uMkhonto we Sizwe.
- Star for Bravery (Silver) (SBS)
- Merit Medal (Silver) (MMS)
- Operational Medal for Southern Africa
- South Africa Service Medal
- Tshumelo Ikatelaho (General Service Medal)
- Maluti Clasp (Operation BOLEAS)
- Unitas (Unity) Medal
- Medalje vir Troue Diens (Medal for Loyal Service) (40 Year Clasp)
- Medalje vir Troue Diens (Medal for Loyal Service) (30 Year Clasp)
- Service Medal (Silver)
- Service Medal (Bronze)
- Order of Military Merit (Grand Officer - Grande-Oficial) (Brazil)

Military offices
Preceded by Godfrey Ngwenya	Chief of the South African National Defence Force; 2011–2021	Succeeded by Rudzani Maphwanya
Preceded by Gilbert Ramano	Chief of the Army; 2004–2011	Succeeded by Vusumuzi Masondo
Preceded by Joan van der Poel	Chief Human Resources Support; 2000-2004	Succeeded by Prof Solly Mollo
