= Order of Mendi for Bravery =

- Badge of the Order of Mendi
- Type: Civilian national order
- Awarded for: Acts of bravery
- Country: Republic of South Africa
- Presented by: The President of South Africa
- Eligibility: South African citizens
- Post-nominals: Gold – OMBG; Silver – OMBS; Bronze – OMBB
- Established: 30 November 2003

Highlights
- Total: 67 awards

The Order of Mendi for Bravery is a South African civilian honour awarded to South Africans who have performed acts of bravery in attempts to save lives or property. It is granted by the President of South Africa for acts performed by South African citizens anywhere in the world. Instituted on 30 November 2003, it was originally called the Mendi Decoration for Bravery and was renamed as an order on 22 October 2004.

The order is named after a World War I troopship, the SS Mendi, which sank after a collision in 1917, killing more than 600 black South African troops. Although it is a civilian honour, it has been awarded to military units, including units involved in rescuing the victims of the 1991 MTS Oceanos wreck and the 2000 Mozambican floods.

== Classes ==
The Order of Mendi has three classes:

- Gold (OMBG), for conspicuous bravery;
- Silver (OMBS), for exceptional bravery; and
- Bronze (OMBB), for outstanding bravery.

== Design ==
The badge of the order has the oval shape of a traditional African shield. On the obverse is an image of the SS Mendi with a blue crane flying overhead, sealed above by a green emerald which is surrounded on three sides by depictions of the bitter aloe. Behind the shield are a crossed assegai and knobkierrie, and the whole design is surrounded by a border decorated with lion pawprints. The reverse displays the Coat of Arms of South Africa. In addition to the neck badge, the award comprises a miniature medallion and a lapel rosette.

== Recipients ==
Members of the Order of Mendi
Recipient	Class	Year	Citation	Ref.
Basil February †	Gold	2003	For bravery and valour in the face of overwhelming odds, and for sacrificing his life for his comrades and in the cause of justice, freedom and democracy.	
Petros Linda Jabane †	Gold	2003	For bravery and valour in the face of overwhelming odds and for sacrificing his life in the cause of non-racial, non-sexist, democratic South Africa.	
South African National Defence Force members involved in Operation Lichi	Gold	2003	For acts of outstanding bravery and courage displayed during the Mozambican floods rescue mission in February 2000.	
Sam Nkomo	Silver	2003	For bravery and fearlessness in the face of grave danger while protecting the lives of tourists near Madikwe, North West.	
Leonard Slabbert	Silver	2003	For a selfless act that led to the saving of eight persons from drowning in the Saulspoort Dam in the Free State.	
South African Defence Force members involved in the Oceanos Rescue Mission	Silver	2003	For acts of bravery and valour displayed during the rescue mission to save passengers and crew of the Oceanos Cruise Liner in August 1991.	
Richard Barney Lekgotla Molokoane †	Gold	2004	For his inspiring leadership, his exceptional bravery and readiness to risk his life fighting for liberation.	
Jimmy Booysen	Silver	2004	For selflessly risking his own life and displaying bravery and heroism whilst saving the lives of three children.	
Etienne Gunter	Bronze	2004	For outstanding bravery, courage and determination displayed while saving a fellow human being from drowning.	
Solomon Mahlangu †	Gold	2005	For bravery and sacrificing his life for freedom and democracy in South Africa.	
Grant Nigel Kirkland	Silver	2005	For selflessly risking his life to save fellow a surfer.	
Simon John Mthombeni	Bronze	2005	For outstanding courage displayed whilst saving lives.	
Benson Tsele †	Gold	2006	For his bravery in engaging the Rhodesian army in military battle for the course of freedom.	
Bhambatha ka Mancinza Zondi †	Gold	2006	For his bravery in leading a rebellion against the repressive laws of the colonialist government and for laying down his life for the cause of justice.	
Adolphus Mvemve †	Silver	2006	For displaying acts of bravery during the struggle against apartheid.	
George Phela †	Silver	2006	For displaying acts of bravery and valour by sacrificing his own life to save the lives of a drowning mother and her child.	
Marcel Christian van Rossum	Bronze	2006	For displaying an act of bravery and courage by putting his life at risk to save the lives of drowning children.	
Elizabeth Komikie Gumede	Bronze	2006	For bravely contributing to the struggle against apartheid.	
Luthuli Detachment of Umkhonto we Sizwe	Gold	2007	For exceptional contribution to the freedom struggle in Southern Africa by embarking on the first-ever armed military operation against white rule in 20th century South Africa, thereby waging pitched battles against the then Rhodesian state, and by displaying immense bravery against tremendous military odds.	
William Mfulwane †	Silver	2007	For sacrificing his life in an attempt to save the life of a boy drowning in a water-filled quarry.	
Thamsanqa Blessing Fihlela, a.k.a. Hugo Nkabinde †	Gold	2008	For his contribution to the ideals of freedom through putting his medical profession to the service of exiled freedom fighters.	
Nomava Shangase †	Gold	2008	For her contribution to the attainment of freedom in South Africa through putting her medical profession to the service of exiled South African freedom fighters.	
Michael Festus Boikhutso †	Gold	2009	For his bravery and valour in the face of overwhelming odds and for sacrificing his life in the cause of justice, freedom and democracy.	
Job Tabane, a.k.a. Cassius Maake †	Gold	2009	For his exceptional contribution to the struggle for freedom, displaying extreme courage against all odds and ultimately sacrificing his life for a democratic South Africa.	
Phindile Ndlovu †	Bronze	2009	For her selfless sacrifice and her fearless actions, in an attempt to save the lives of young children from the fire and thereby sacrificing her own life.	
G5 Unit of Umkhonto we Sizwe, led by Solly Shoke	Gold	2010	For displaying acts of bravery and valour during the struggle for the liberation of the people of South Africa.	
Makhosi "Tholi" Nyoka †	Gold	2010	For her bravery and for sacrificing her life in the cause of justice, freedom and democracy in South Africa.	
Harry Gwala †	Gold	2010	For displaying enormous courage and bravery during the struggle against apartheid.	
Kgosi Galeshewe †	Gold	2010	For his bravery in leading a rebellion against the repressive laws of the colonialist government and for economic emancipation of his people.	
Phila Portia Ndwandwe †	Silver	2010	For demonstrating bravery and valour and for sacrificing her life for her comrades in the cause for a non-racial, non-sexist and democratic South Africa.	
Martyrs of the Matola Raid †	Gold	2011	For paying the supreme price for freedom and for sacrificing their lives in pursuit of a just, free, non-racial and non sexist democratic society.	
Gertrude Mary Christina Holland †	Silver	2011	For providing shelter to orphaned children and sacrificing her own life to save the lives of the children who were in her care.	
Donald Thumamina Mboto †	Bronze	2011	For a selfless act that led him to lose his life while trying to save a drowning child in St. Michaels beach in KwaZulu-Natal.	
Raymond Basil van Staden †	Bronze	2011	For his selfless act that led to the saving of a person from drowning at Warner Beach in Durban.	
Michael Janse van Rensburg †	Gold	2012	For displaying an act of bravery, courage and fearlessness by putting his life in danger to save the life of a fellow human being who was drowning.	
Neil John Sharrocks	Silver	2012	For displaying an act of bravery by putting his life at risk to save the lives of 44 children who were at the risk of drowning when the bus they were travelling in capsized and fell into a river.	
Cletus Mzimela	Gold	2013	For his precision under pressure, and gallantry in the face of crippling odds in pursuit in the liberation of the people of South Africa.	
Alfred Duma	Silver	2013	For his leadership in times of difficulty, and his brave contribution to the rights of workers and liberation of the people of South Africa.	
Riot Makhomanisi Mkhwanazi	Silver	2013	For his excellent and valiant contribution to the liberation of the people of South Africa.	
Russell Maphanga	Silver	2014	For his leadership in times of difficulty and brave contribution in fighting for the rights of workers and liberation of the people of South Africa.	
Indres Naidoo	Silver	2014	For his excellent contribution in the fight against the unjust laws of apartheid, often at times putting his life in danger to ensure freedom for all South Africans.	
Shirish Nanabhai	Silver	2014	For his bravery in the struggle against apartheid and resolute determination to realise the dream of a free and democratic South Africa.	
Reggie Vandeyar	Silver	2014	For his remarkable bravery during the struggle against apartheid and for striving for a free and democratic South Africa.	
Elizabeth Barrett	Bronze	2014	For her courageous act of selflessness in saving 14 children from a burning house and her continued giving to vulnerable orphans and street children.	
Mpumelelo Washington Bongco †	Gold	2015	For his exceptional contribution in pursuit of equality and universal suffrage in South Africa. He never relented, even when this meant endangering his life in a society where anti-government sentiments were crushed with chilling brutality.	
Joseph Morolong †	Silver	2015	For his excellent contribution to the fight for liberation in South Africa. He endured tremendous personal persecution for the ideal of a democratic and liberated society.	
Caleb Motshabi	Silver	2015	For his excellent contribution to the fight for the liberation of the people of South Africa. He enabled a safe passage for many young people who went into exile to fight for freedom.	
Eric Mtshali	Silver	2015	For his excellent contribution to the fight against the oppressive and racist apartheid regime. Despite great risks, he was never deterred from fighting against injustice.	
Jetro Ndlovu	Bronze	2015	For his excellent contribution to the fight for freedom, equality and democracy in South Africa.	
Hermanus Loots †	Silver	2016	For his gallant fight against the oppression of the majority of South Africans during the hard times of apartheid injustice.	
Maqashu Leonard Mdingi †	Silver	2016	For his excellent contribution to the liberation struggle and steadfast belief in the equality of all who lived in South Africa.	
Ulysses Modise †	Silver	2016	For his excellent contribution to the struggle for the liberation of the people of South Africa.	
Peter Sello Motau, a.k.a. Paul Dikeledi †	Silver	2016	For his excellent contribution to the liberation struggle. His selfless sacrifice, bravery and thirst for freedom led to democracy at the ultimate cost of his own life.	
Wilson Ndaliso Boy Ngcayiya, a.k.a. Bogart Soze †	Silver	2016	For his excellent contribution to the fight for the liberation of this country.	
Joseph "Mpisi" Nduli †	Silver	2016	For his excellent contribution to the fight for the liberation of the people of South Africa. His steadfast belief in the equality of all citizens inspired him to fight fearlessly until democracy was realised.	
Sam Ntuli †	Silver	2016	For his excellent contribution to peace-building during a particularly violent and delicate time in the history of the liberation struggle. He paid the ultimate price for his dedication to peace and freedom.	
Jackie Sedibe	Silver	2016	For her excellent contribution to the struggle for freedom and courage in joining Umkhonto we Sizwe. She fought for the liberation of our people and selflessly sacrificed her time to ensure that all South Africans live as equals.	
Sizakele Sigxashe †	Silver	2016	For his excellent contribution to the fight against the oppression of the people of South Africa. His bravery and courage of convictions saw him leave his home and loved ones into distant lands to fight for the freedom that is enjoyed today.	
Peter Lesego Tshikare, a.k.a. Peter Boroko †	Silver	2016	For his selfless contribution to the struggle for the liberation of the people of South Africa. He gallantly joined the armed struggle with the conviction that no one deserved to be treated with indignity.	
Thapelo Tambani †	Silver	2019	For his selfless act of saving another life, which led to his unfortunate demise.	
Gcinisizwe Khwezi Sylvester Kondile †	Gold	2021	For his ultimate sacrifice to the liberation of South Africa. He endured unspeakable torture and cruelty, refusing to betray his comrades right to the victorious end of his life.	
Isaac William Dyobha Wauchope †	Gold	2021	For providing morale through poignant words and support in the darkest hour of soldiers who died in the sinking of the SS Mendi. His words and courage are his iconic legacy that lives on.	
Chand Basson †	Silver	2021	For his ultimate sacrifice of saving lives from certain death and taking a stray bullet shielding a stranger from a gang.	
Roydon Olckers †	Silver	2021	For courageously saving the lives of two learners and sacrificing his own.	
Denver Kok †	Silver	2023	For his selfless and heroic act in saving the lives of commuters in immediate danger. Through his courageous deed, he paid the ultimate price to ensure the survival of other people.	
Mary Anne Thole †	Silver	2023	For her selfless act to save others that led to her losing her life. The courageous act remains her legacy to all who knew her young life.	
Kgomotso Thomas †	Silver	2023	For his heroic rescue of two young people from drowning and in the process, he paid the ultimate price.	

== See also ==
- South African civil honours
