= Joint Operations Division =

- Emblem Flag
- Country: South Africa
- Part of: South African National Defence Force
- Anniversaries: 1 August 1997

Commanders
- Chief of Joint Operations: Lt. Gen Rudzani Maphwanya

The Joint Operations Division is a component of the South African National Defence Force tasked with conducting Joint Operations involving the various arms of the SANDF.

== History ==
The Joint Operations Division was established on 1 August 1997 during a major reorganisation of the armed forces.

Before the re-organisation each arm of Service had an operations staff responsible for deploying its units as directed by the Service chief and the Chief of the SANDF. The Chief of the SANDF had an operations staff, playing a co-ordinating role.

Following the re-organisation, each arm of service had to provide properly trained and equipped forces to Joint Operations. Joint Operations would then deploy these forces as necessary and revert to their parent service following the mission. The exception is the Special Forces Brigade, which is directly under the command of the Chief of the SANDF and is permanently allocated to Joint Operations.

There are nine joint operational-tactical headquarters (HQ) under the SANDF Chief of Joint Operations, under which many Army units operate. For example, Regional Joint Task Force North (RJTFN) is situated in Pietersburg, commanded by a major-general. The RJTFN HQ is responsible for the operational deployment of the Group headquarters or tactical headquarters under its command. RJTFN is subdivided into areas, each under the operational control of a group headquarters. For example, the Group headquarters at Musina is called the Soutpansberg Military Area. The other areas are Group 33, Nelspruit; Group 12, Ermelo; and Group 14, Pietersburg.

Headquarters Regional Joint Task Force West is located in Cape Town, while HQ Regional Joint Task Force East is in Durban.
