= Northern Transvaal Command =

- Command insignia
- Active: 1959–2000
- Country: Republic of South Africa
- Branch: South African Army
- Type: Command (military formation)
- Headquarters: Pretoria, South Africa

Commanders
- Notable commanders: Pieter Grobbelaar

Northern Transvaal Command was a command of the South African Army. It was active from 1959 to mid 2000 when it was disestablished. Formerly it was named Northern Command from 1946 to 1959.

== History ==
=== Origins ===
==== Union Defence Force Military Districts ====
The command's origins may date to the formations of Military districts, No 5 and 6 in 1926, which then became Transvaal Command in 1934. Thereafter there were several quick name changes: Roberts Heights & Transvaal Command c. 1936; Voortrekkerhoogte & Transvaal Command 1939, and then Transvaal Command c. 1940. Later the command became Northern Command in 1946; Northern Transvaal Command in 1959. In 1939 Roberts' Heights and Transvaal Command, with its headquarters at Roberts' Heights (now Thaba Tshwane), contained 6th Infantry Brigade, 1 Field Survey Squadron SAEC, the artillery depot, parts of the Special Service Battalion, elements of the Permanent Garrison Artillery, and the Artillery School.

Its headquarters was in Pretoria, and within its command boundaries, it contained a number of important Active Citizen Force field formations, notably 81 Armoured Brigade (part of 8th South African Armoured Division). Depending upon the command boundaries, it may also have included 72 Motorised Brigade with its headquarters at Johannesburg and 73 Motorised Brigade with its headquarters in the Johannesburg suburb of Kensington.

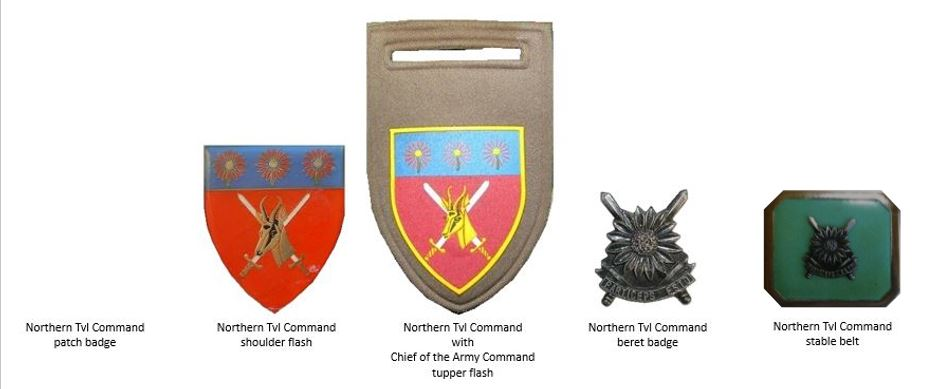
SADF era Northern Transvaal Command insignia

==== Under the SADF ====
In the early 1980s it became clear that the sheer size of Northern Transvaal Command's territory made command and control as well as logistical functions extremely difficult. These as well as other security considerations led to the decision to subdivide Northern Transvaal Command into three Commands in 1984: Northern Transvaal Command (Pretoria); Eastern Transvaal Command, probably covering what later became the Eastern Transvaal (Nelspruit); and Far North Command (Pietersburg) (commanded in succession by Charles Lloyd and, from February 1987, Georg Meiring). The two new Commands were regarded as theatres and as such also had responsibility for conventional operations (and units) within their areas. For example, Far North Command had 73 Motorised Brigade within its area.

== Groups and Commandos ==
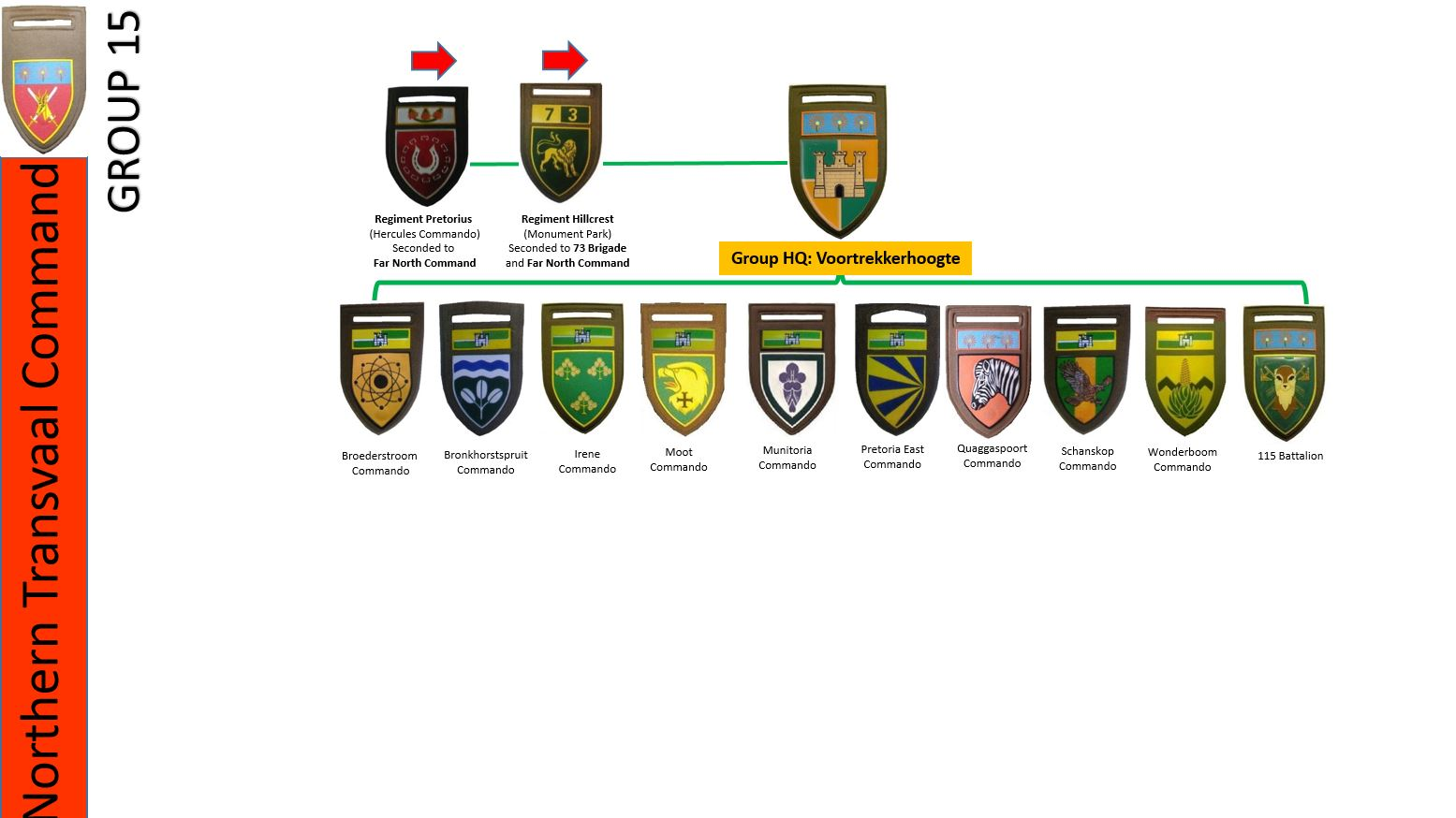
SADF era Northern Transvaal Command Commando Structure

=== Group 15 (Voortrekkerhoogte) ===
- Broederstroom Commando
- Bronkhorstspruit Commando
- Hercules Commando
- Hillcrest Commando
- Irene Commando
- Moot Commando
- Munitoria Commando
- Pretoria East Commando
- Quaggapoort Commando
- Schanskop Commando
- Wonderboom Commando

== Leadership ==
Leadership of Northern Transvaal Command
From	Commanding Officers	To	Ribbon
n.d.	Col ? Pieter Grobbelaar SSA,DSO (Note: Later General) (Note: Later Commandant General of the Union Defence Force)	n.d.	Star of South Africa SSA Distinguished Service Order DSO
c. 1950	Col Booysie van der Riet SM,MC,SSA (Note: Later Lieutenant General)	n.d.	Southern Cross Medal SM Military Cross MC Star of South Africa SSA
1 Jan 1964	Col S.'Faan' Hugo SM (Note: Officer in Command of Northern Transvaal Command on Friday 2 October 1964, during Annual Cadet Inspection and Review of Pretoria Boys High School.)	Sep 1965	Southern Cross Medal SM
1965	Brig Jannie H Burgher SM,OBE	1966	Southern Cross Medal SM Order of the British Empire OBE
Dec 1966	Brig Willem Louw SM,SSA (Note: Later Chief of the South African Army)	Dec 1967	Southern Cross Medal SM Star of South Africa SSA
1970	Brig Phil Pretorius SM (Note: Later Major General)	1975	Southern Cross Medal SM
1975	Brig Pieter van der Westhuizen SM,SSAG,MMM	1976	Southern Cross Medal SM Star of South Africa SSAG Military Merit Medal MMM
1978	Brig Wolfgang Paetzold	1980	
1980	Maj Gen Pieter Hanekom SM	1982	Southern Cross Medal SM
1982	Maj Gen Frans van den Berg SD,SM,MMM	1984	Southern Cross Decoration SD Southern Cross Medal SM Military Merit Medal MMM
1984	Brig J.P.M. 'Hans' Moller SD (Note: late SACMP (20 October 1988))	1988	Southern Cross Decoration SD
1988	Brig Gert Opperman SD,SM,MMM,SAStC	1993	Southern Cross Decoration SD Southern Cross Medal SM Military Merit Medal MMM South African Staff Corps SAStC
1993	Brig Anton van Graan	1994	
1994	Brig Wouter Lombard	1995	
7 Apr 1995	Brig Hennie Schultz SM,MMM	31 Dec 1995	Southern Cross Medal SM Military Merit Medal MMM
1 Jan 1996	Maj Gen Hennie Schultz SM,MMM	n.d	Southern Cross Medal SM Military Merit Medal MMM
From	Command Sgts Major	To	Ribbon
	No known incumbents		
