= Pieter van der Westhuizen =

South African Army officer (born 1937)

Lieutenant General Pieter Willem van der Westhuizen SSA SM MMM
- Born: 24 December 1937 (age 88); Nylstroom, Transvaal, Union of South Africa
- Military career
- Allegiance: South Africa; South Africa
- Branch: South African Army
- Service years: 1959–1992
- Rank: Lieutenant General
- Nickname: Wessie
- Unit: 2 South African Infantry Battalion
- Commands: Chief of Staff Intelligence; Chief Director Military Intelligence; Director Covert Collection; OC Northern Transvaal Command; Commandant Army College
- Awards
- Other work: Ambassador to Chile

Pieter van der Westhuizen, SSA SM MMM (born 24 December 1937) was a South African Army officer who served as the Chief of Staff Intelligence from 1978–1985 and later Secretary of the State Security Council.

== Military career ==
He joined the South African Army as a Lieutenant in 1959. He joined the artillery, and would later serve as a Troop Commander at 11 Field Battery, 1 Special Service Battalion. He changed mustering to the infantry and served as Company Commander at 2 South African Infantry Battalion Group. In 1964, he was appointed to the Infantry School as an officer instructor. By 1968, he was appointed as a staff officer at the Directorate of Military Intelligence. He completed the French Command & Staff Course in the sixties and was appointed the Commandant Army College in 1974.

Commandant South African Army College in 1973 until 1975. He commanded Northern Transvaal Command from 1975–1976 before becoming a Director of Collection at Chief of Military Intelligence in 1976. He was appointed Chief of Staff Intelligence in June 1978. He held that position until 1985 before becoming the Secretary of the State Security Council until 1988. He was appointed as the Ambassador to Chile returned to South Africa in Dec 1991 and served on the staff of the Chief of the Defence Force until 31 March 1992 when he retired. He went back to Chile where he ventured on business and stayed there until 2021.

== Awards and decorations ==
- Star of South Africa (Gold) (SSAG)
- South African Police Star for Outstanding Service (SOE)
- Southern Cross Medal (1952) (SM)
- Military Merit Medal (MMM)
- Good Service Medal (Gold (30 Years))
- Good Service Medal (Silver (20 Years))
- Good Service Medal (Bronze (10 Years))
- Order of the Cloud and Banner (4^{th} Grade - with Special Cravat) (ORB) (Taiwan)
- Order of the Cloud and Banner (3^{rd} Grade - with Yellow Grand Cordon) (ORB) (Taiwan)
- Grand Cross of the Order of Bernardo O'Higgins (Chile)
- Paraguayan decoration

Diplomatic posts
| Preceded by Michal Muller | Ambassador to Chile; 1988–1991 | Succeeded by Leon Malan Brand |
Government offices
| Preceded by Andre van Deventer | Secretary of the State Security Council; 1985–1988 | Succeeded by Charles Lloyd |
Military offices
| Preceded by Ivan Lemmer | Chief of Staff Intelligence; 1979–1985 | Succeeded by Andries Putter |
| Preceded by Ivan Lemmer | Acting Chief of Staff Intelligence; 1978–1979 | Succeeded by Himself |
| Preceded by Phil Pretorius | OC Northern Transvaal; 1975–1976 | Succeeded by Boytjie Viviers |
| Preceded by Mac Kotzé | Commandant Army College; 1973 – 1975 | Succeeded by George Kruys |
