= Andre van Deventer =

Lieutenant General Andries Jacobus van Deventer SSAS SM MMM
- Born: 21 October 1930 (age 95); King William's Town
- Spouse: Aletta Maria "Ria" van Deventer née Moulder
- Military career
- Allegiance: South Africa
- Branch: South African Army
- Service years: 1955–1985
- Rank: Lieutenant General
- Nickname: Andre
- Unit: 2 South African Infantry Battalion
- Commands: Chief of Staff Finance; I South African Corps; SWA Command; 2 South African Infantry Battalion
- Conflicts: Operation Savannah
- Awards
- Other work: Secretary: State Security Council; Ambassador to Ciskei

Andre van Deventer SSAS SM MMM (born 21 October 1930) was a South African Army officer who served as the Chief of Staff Finance from 1976 to 1979 and later Secretary of the State Security Council until 1985.

He joined the Permanent Force in 1955 and completed the Senior Command and Staff Duties Course in 1961. He served as a Member of the Directing Staff at the South African Army College. He commanded 2 South African Infantry Battalion from January 1965 until December 1967. He completed the British Army Staff Course at Camberley. Officer Commanding SWA Command. He later served as Officer Commanding Orange Free State Command and North Western Command.

In 1974 he was appointed General Officer Commanding of I South African Corps. During the Angolan Civil War (1975-1976) he served as Commander of Task Force 101.

He served as Chief of Staff Finance from 1 October 1976 to 6 August 1979. He later served as the Secretary of the State Security Council till 1985.

== Awards and decorations ==
- Star of South Africa (Silver) (SSAS)
- Southern Cross Medal (1952) (SM)
- Military Merit Medal (MMM)
- Pro Patria Medal (South Africa) (with Cunene Clasp) (Note: Only the Cunene clasp was awarded, to members who served in Angola during Operation Savannah in 1975 and 1976. Recipients of the clasp wear a button, with the letter C encircled by a wreath, on the ribbon bar.)
- Good Service Medal (Gold (30 Years))
- Good Service Medal (Silver (20 Years))
- Permanent Force Good Service Medal
- Order of the Cloud and Banner (3^{rd} Grade - with Yellow Grand Cordon) (ORB) (Taiwan)
- Paraguayan decoration

== Notes ==
Government offices
New title	Secretary of the State Security Council; 1980 – 1985	Succeeded by Pieter van der Westhuizen
Military offices
Preceded by Lt Gen Ernest Pienaar	Chief of Staff Finance; 1976 – 1979	Succeeded by Lt Gen Willem J. Bergh
Preceded by Brig Magnus Malan	Officer Commanding South West Africa Command; 1968–1970	Succeeded by Brig Ben de Wet Roos
Preceded by Brig Boet Stapelberg	OC North Western Command; 1970 – 1972	Succeeded by Brig Gert Boshoff
