= Willem J. Bergh =

Retired South African Air Force officer

Lieutenant General Willem Jacobus Bergh SD SM MMM
- Born: 14 July 1929 (age 97); Potgietersrus
- Spouse: Josephine Anne Vera Gibson
- Military career
- Allegiance: South Africa
- Branch: South African Air Force
- Rank: Lieutenant General
- Commands: Chief of Staff Finance
- Awards: Southern Cross Decoration SD Southern Cross Medal SM Military Merit Medal MMM Good Service Medal

Lieutenant General Willem Bergh SD SM MMM (born 14 July 1929) is a retired South African Air Force officer who served as Chief of Staff Finance for the South African Defence Force.

In 1952, he was the navigator on the flight to deliver the Coelacanth, discovered in Madagascar by Prof J. L. B. Smith, to South Africa.

== Awards and decorations ==
- Southern Cross Decoration (SD)
- Southern Cross Medal (1952) (SM)
- Military Merit Medal (MMM)
- Good Service Medal (Gold (30 Years))
- Good Service Medal (Silver (20 Years))
- Good Service Medal (Bronze (10 Years))

Military offices
Preceded by Lt Gen Andre van Deventer	Chief of Staff Finance; 1979–1982	Succeeded by V Adm Marthinus Bekker
