= Raymond Holtzhausen =

Retired South African Army General

Lieutenant General Raymond Francois Holtzhausen SSA SD SM MMM
- Born: 1934 (age 91–92); Bloemfontein
- Military career
- Allegiance: South Africa
- Branch: South African Army
- Service years: –1989
- Rank: Lieutenant General
- Unit: 4 Field Regiment
- Commands: Chief of Staff Personnel; Inspector General Army; GOC I South African Corps; OC Infantry School
- Awards: Star of South Africa SSAG Southern Cross Decoration SD Southern Cross Medal SM Military Merit Medal MMM Pro Patria Medal Southern Africa Medal General Service Medal (South Africa) Good Service Medal Permanent Force Good Service Medal
- Other work: Council for Military Veterans Organizations

Lieutenant General Raymond Francois Holtzhausen SSA SD SM MMM (born 1934) is a retired South African Army general who formerly served as Chief of Staff Personnel before his retirement.

== Military career ==
He served as Officer Commanding of South African Infantry School from 1972 to 1974. He was appointed as the Inspector General Army and as Chief of Army Staff Personnel. After Lt Gen Boshoff retired early, he served as Chief of Staff Personnel under Gen Viljoen and Gen Geldenhuys. He retired in 1989.

== Awards and decorations ==
- Star of South Africa (Gold) (SSAG)
- Southern Cross Decoration (SD)
- Southern Cross Medal (1952) (SM)
- Military Merit Medal (MMM)
- Pro Patria Medal
- Southern Africa Medal
- General Service Medal (South Africa)
- Good Service Medal (Gold (30 Years))
- Good Service Medal (Silver (20 Years))
- Permanent Force Good Service Medal

Military offices
Preceded by Gert Boshoff	Chief of Staff Personnel; 1981–1989	Succeeded by Len Meyer
Preceded by Pik van Noorden	OC Infantry School; 1972–1974	Succeeded by Deon Mortimer
