= Holtzhausen =

Holtzhausen is a surname. Notable people with the surname include:

- Deon Holtzhausen (born 1967), South African general
- Maryka Holtzhausen (born 1987), South African netball player
- Raymond Holtzhausen (born 1934), South African general
