= Admiral Murray =

Admiral Murray may refer to:

- Alexander Murray (1816–1884), U.S. Navy rear admiral
- Brian Murray (governor) (1921–1991), Royal Australian Navy rear admiral
- George Murray (Royal Navy officer, born 1741) (1741–1797), British Royal Navy vice admiral
- George Murray (Royal Navy officer, born 1759) (1759–1819), British Royal Navy vice admiral
- George Murray, 6th Lord Elibank (died 1785), British Royal Navy rear admiral
- George D. Murray (1889–1956), U.S. Navy admiral
- Larry Murray (admiral) (born 1947), Royal Canadian Navy vice admiral
- Leonard W. Murray (1896–1971), Royal Canadian Navy rear admiral
- Paul Murray (admiral) (fl. 1980s–1990s), South African Navy vice admiral
- Robert Murray (Royal Navy officer) (c. 1763–1834), British Royal Navy admiral
- Stuart S. Murray (1898–1980), U.S. Navy vice admiral
