= Raubenheimer =

Raubenheimer is a surname. Notable people with the surname include:

- Ben Raubenheimer, South African army officer
- Brian Raubenheimer (1940–2021), South African racing driver
- Carl Raubenheimer (born 1983), South African cricketer
- Davon Raubenheimer (born 1984), South African rugby union player
- Marc Raubenheimer (1952–1983), South African pianist
- Shaun Raubenheimer (born 1983), South African rugby union player
