= Dries van der Lith =

Air Force pilot

Lieutenant General Andries J.S. van der Lith SD SM MMM
- Spouse: Johanna Magdalena Catharina Cronje
- Military career
- Allegiance: South Africa
- Branch: South African Air Force
- Rank: Lieutenant General
- Nickname: Dries
- Awards: Southern Cross Decoration SD Southern Cross Medal SM Military Merit Medal MMM Pro Patria Medal Southern Africa Medal General Service Medal (South Africa) Good Service Medal

Lieutenant General Dries van der Lith SD SM MMM is a former air force pilot who served as a Chief of Staff Planning in the SADF.

== Military career ==
He served as Chief of Staff Planning from 1991 – 1992.

== Awards and decorations ==
- Southern Cross Decoration (SD)
- Southern Cross Medal (1975) (SM)
- Military Merit Medal (MMM)
- Pro Patria Medal
- Southern Africa Medal
- General Service Medal (South Africa)
- Good Service Medal (Gold (30 Years))
- Good Service Medal (Silver (20 Years))
- Good Service Medal (Bronze (10 Years))
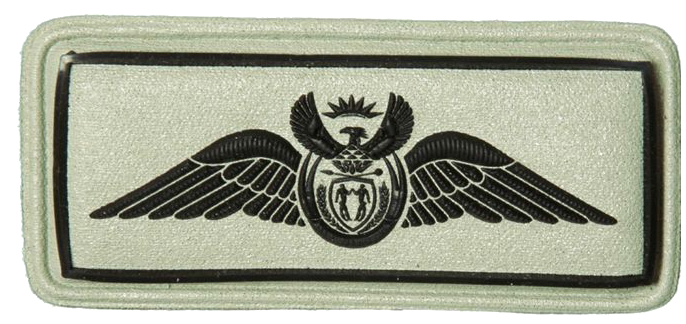
- SAAF Pilot's Wings (more than 2500 hours

Military offices
Preceded by Frans van den Berg	Chief of Staff Planning; 1991–1992	Succeeded by Koos Bisschoff
