= Hercules Commando =

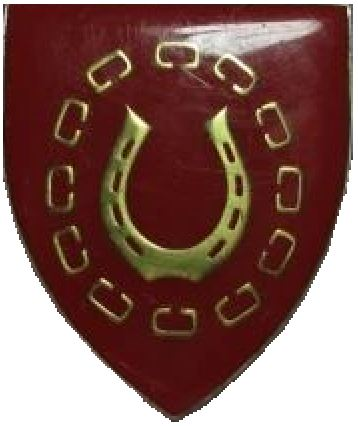
- Hercules Commando / Regiment Pretorius emblem
- Country: South Africa
- Allegiance: Union Defence Force; Republic of South Africa; Republic of South Africa
- Branch: South African Army; South African Army
- Type: Infantry
- Role: Light Infantry
- Size: One Battalion
- Part of: South African Infantry Corps; Army Territorial Reserve
- Garrison/HQ: Hercules, Pretoria
- Motto: "Pede intrepide" (forward fearlessly)

Hercules Commando was a light infantry regiment of the South African Army. It formed part of the South African Army Infantry Formation as well as the South African Territorial Reserve.

== History ==
=== Origin ===
This unit was initially established as the Pretoria North West Rifle Association in 1923.

=== Operations ===
==== With the UDF ====
By 1925, the name was changed to the Pretoria Moot Rifle Association. Rifle Associations were however disbanded with the outbreak of WW2.

By 1948, skietkommandos were established and Hercules Commando was initially based in the Pretoria suburb of Hercules. A total of 490 men were recruited.

==== With the SADF ====
===== Upgraded to Regiment =====
By 1983 the existing elements of the commando was converted into Regiment Pretorius.

The unit served in the operational areas of South West Africa and the Far Northern Transvaal.

The Regiment continued to wear the infantry Bok up to 1989 when a new badge with a caracals head was introduced.

The Regiment received its National Colours on 31 May 1990.

The Regiment was converted to an urban coin unit, now with Northern Transvaal Command.

The Regiment was moved to a new HQ at Voortrekkerhoogte in May 1992.

==== With the SANDF ====
===== Amalgamation into Tshwane Regiment =====
In December 2002, Regiment Pretorius with other structures in the Greater Pretoria area was amalgamated into the new Tshwane Regiment.

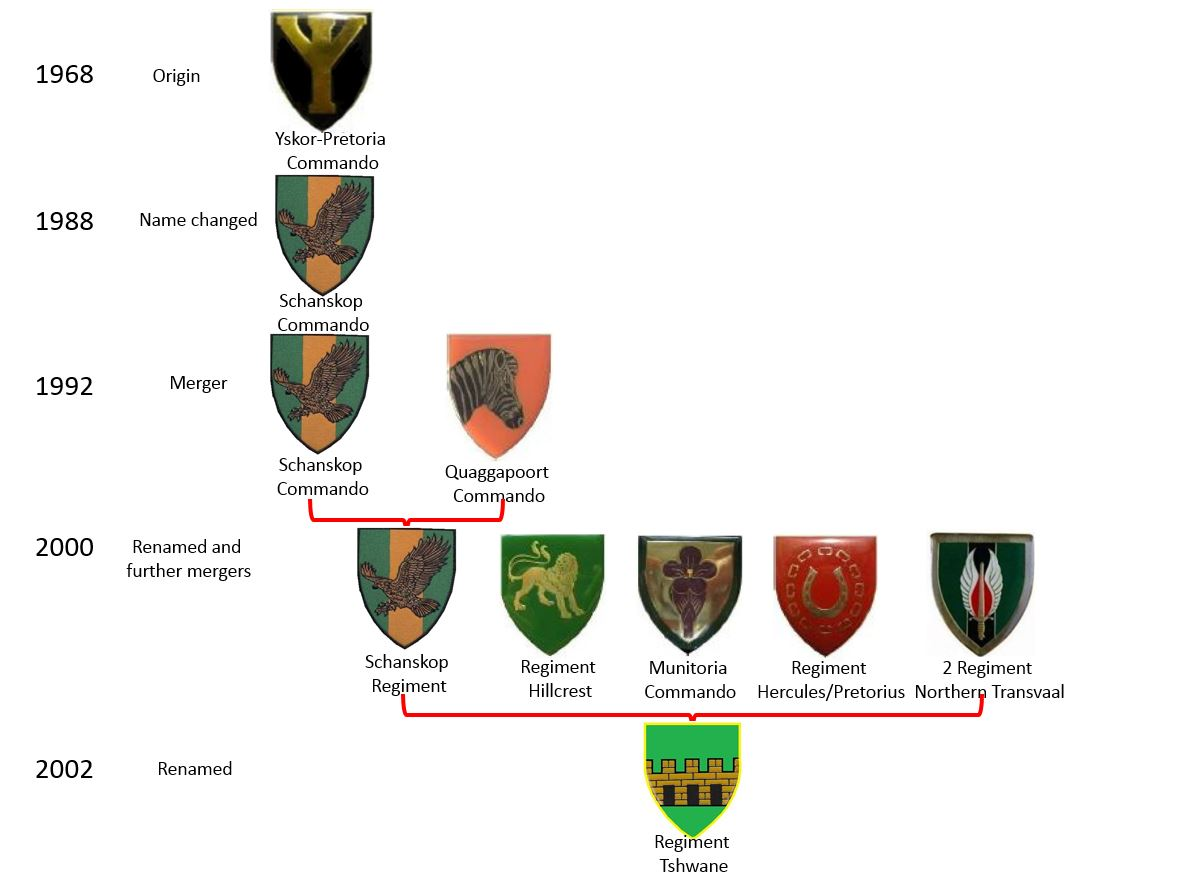
SANDF History of Tshwane Regiment

== Leadership ==
Leadership
From	Honorary Colonels	To	Ribbon
	No known incumbents		
From	Commanding Officers	To	Ribbon
	No known incumbents		
From	Regimental Sergeants Major	To	Ribbon
	No known incumbents		

== Insignia ==
=== Dress Insignia ===
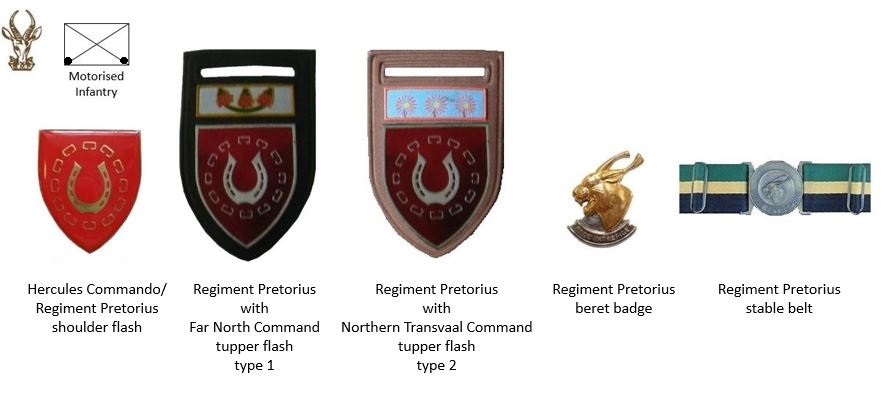
SADF era Regiment Pretorius insignia

== See also ==
- South African Commando System
