= South African Infantry School =

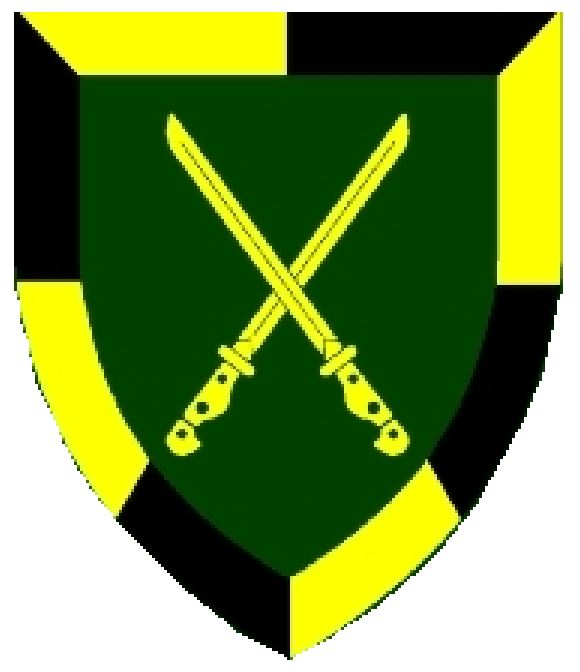
- SANDF Infantry School emblem
- Founded: November 1953; 72 years ago
- Country: South Africa
- Branch: South African Army
- Type: Infantry Training
- Part of: South African Army Infantry Formation
- Garrison/HQ: Oudsthoorn
- Motto: Exerce Perfectioni (Strive for excellence)

Commanders
- Current commander: Col D. M. Madie

Insignia
- Beret Colour: Green

The South African Infantry School is within the Army Base in Oudtshoorn, Western Cape. The Infantry School, now at Oudtshoorn, was established in November 1953, after a history dating back to the South African Military School in Bloemfontein, established in 1912. It is the Infantry's “centre of excellence” and offers a number of infantry-specific courses to regulars and Reservists.

== History ==
=== Early history ===
On the 1 July 1912, the South African Military School was established in the old President's residence in Bloemfontein. The school's name was changed to The School of Musketry on the 1 November 1912 and moved to Tempe in Bloemfontein.

On the outbreak of the First World War in 1914, the school at Tempe was closed and all the members of the staff were transferred to Potchefstroom. These staff members were responsible for the next number of years for the training of volunteers for overseas duty.

During 1920, the South African Military School was established at what was then called Roberts Heights (This has subsequently changed names twice, first to Voortrekkerhoogte and now to Thaba Tshwane). The college was granted the status of School in 1924 as a result of the training of the first group of permanent force Officer Candidates. The school was enlarged just before the outbreak of the Second World War in 1935 with the creation of the following branches:

1. G Branch
2. Weapon Training Branch
3. Signals Branch
4. Training Depot
5. National Reserve Volunteers
6. Research and Development Branch
7. Chemical Warfare Branch
8. Regiment Training
9. Armour Branch

During the 1940–1945 years, certain of these branches were moved. The Regimental Training was taken over by the Weapon Training Branch for example. It was during this era that the idea was mooted that there should be an independent Infantry School.

In November 1953 the Weapon Training Branch was officially renamed the Infantry School in terms of SADF order No. 206/53, but this renamed unit remained an integral part of the South African Military College.

On 1 October 1963, after having been a ghost unit for almost 10 years, the Infantry School was finally established as a self accounting unit. At this stage and until 1 January 1964, Maj J. H. Rossouw, SAIC, was appointed Acting Officer Commanding. It was during this period that the decision to move the Infantry School to Oudtshoorn, its present location, was taken.

=== Oudtshoorn ===
On 1 January 1964 the new, fully fledged Infantry School opened its portals in Oudtshoorn to admit its first students under the command of Cmdt M. N. Horner, SAIC. Since that day, the School has undergone two major metamorphoses. The first being in January 1974 when, in addition to its established role, it assumed the role of the unit where National Servicemen Junior Leaders were trained. The second occurred in December 1976 when it was decided to remove virtually all Citizen Force courses from the School and transfer them to the Danie Theron Combat School in Kimberley.

In January 1977 another historic event occurred at the Infantry School that is the advent of the first prospective Cadet Officer intake of then recently qualified teachers. In those years, the unit had shouldered its share of the burden of duty in the operational area. Later on it had become policy to send companies of National Servicemen to the operational area as part of their training as Junior Leaders.

1977 was an important year in the school's history as they received their Colours on the 1 October 1977 and were granted the Freedom of the City by the City Council of Oudtshoorn.

On the 28 March 1980, the Infantry School received its own song from the well known Dirkie and Doll de Villiers. The song was handed over to the Commanding Officer, Col W.G. Kritzinger, during a parade at the school and the song was performed for the first time by the School's choir.

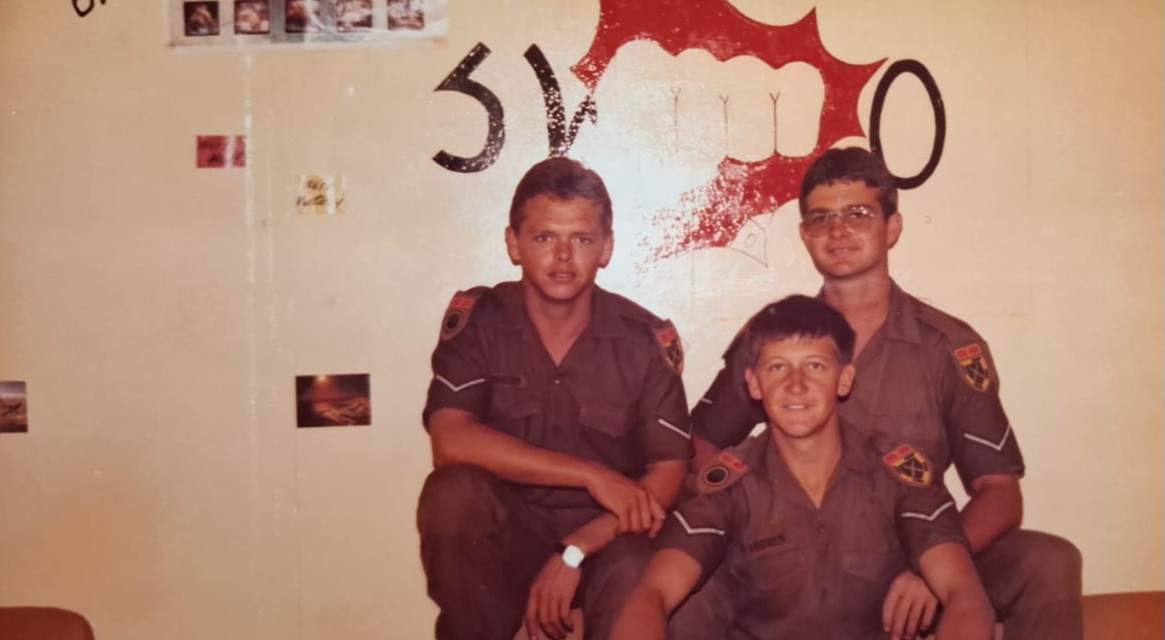
Stephan Grobler and two other SADF soldiers during Jnr Leaders training (Basics) in Oudtshoorn Infantry training school. Stephan (who is on the left) later became an Officer over a Platoon in the 301 Battalion but the other two soldiers have yet to be identified

During December 1980, the Exerce Perfectioni Statue was handed over to the School by the City Council of Oudtshoorn. The statue was unveiled by Gen Magnus Malan.

== Insignia ==
- Current role: Corps school.
- Current base: Oudtshoorn
- Motto: Exerce Perfectioni (Strive for excellence)

=== Previous dress insignia ===
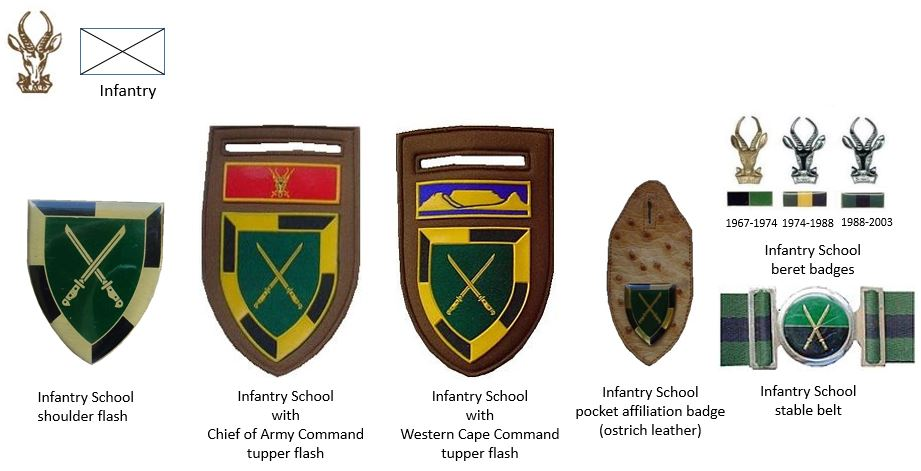
SADF era Infantry School insignia

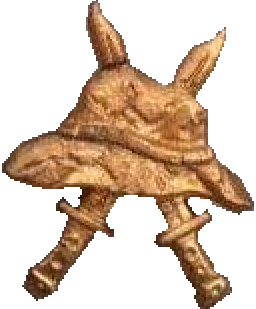
SADF era Infantry School Irregular warfare blazer pin

== Leadership ==
Leadership of the South African Infantry School
From	Commanding Officers	To	Ribbon
1 Oct 1963	Maj J. H. Rossouw (Acting)	1 Jan 1964	
1 Jan 1964	Cmdt M. N. Horner	19 Sept 1966	
20 Sept 1966	Cmdt V. A. J Torlage	30 Jan 1968	
31 Jan 1968	Col H. K. J. van Noorden, (later Maj Gen) SM	3 Jan 1972	Southern Cross Medal SM
4 Jan 1972	Col R.F. Holtzhausen, (later Lt Gen) SSAS,SD,SM	31 Dec 1973	Star of South Africa SSAS Southern Cross Decoration SD Southern Cross Medal SM
8 Feb 1974	Col D. J. Mortimer (later Maj Gen)	15 Jan 1976	
16 Jan 1976	Col R. Badenhorst, (later Lt Gen) SD	6 Dec 1979	Southern Cross Decoration SD
7 Dec 1979	Col W.G. Kritzinger (later Lt Gen)	10 Dec 1981	
11 Dec 1981	Col C. J. (Chris) Serfontein (later Maj Genl)	14 Dec 1984	
15 Dec 1984	Col H. J. Schultz (Hennie) (later Maj Genl)	19 Dec 1988	
19 Dec 1988	Col P. Stroebel (Paul) (later Brig Genl)	19 Dec 1992	
19 Dec 1992	Col J. Liebenberg (Koos Blok)	1 Jan 1997	
1 Jan 1997	Col P. J. Le Roux (Flip)	31 Dec 1998	
1 Jan 1999	Col K. K. Dzingwa	10 July 2000	
21 Sept 2000	Col M. N. Mbethe	30 Nov 2005	
1 Dec 2005	Col X. Mankayi (later Brig Gen)	2014	
2014	Col Nkhabu Nthejane	2018	
2018	Col D. M. Madie	Present	
From	Regimental Sgts Major	To	Ribbon
1 Jan 1964	WO1 B.R. Kruger	3 Jan 1973	
4 Jan 1973	WO1 L. B. Calitz	11 June 1976	
12 June 1976	WO1 F. D. Boshoff	20 Dec 1977	
14 Dec 1977	WO1 D. J. Vorster	30 Sept 1986	
1 Oct 1986	WO1 J. G. C. Schuurman	31 Dec 1993	
1 Jan 1994	WO1 J. F. E. van Zyl	31 Dec 1999	
1 Jan 2000	WO1 J. H. Botes	30 Nov 2005	
1 Dec 2006	WO1 R. McKenzie	n.d.	
