= Ben Raubenheimer =

Former South African army officer

Lieutenant General Ben Spies Raubenheimer SD, SM, MMM
- Military career
- Allegiance: South Africa
- Branch: South African Army
- Rank: Lieutenant General
- Commands: Chief of Staff Finance
- Awards: Southern Cross Decoration SD Southern Cross Medal SM Military Merit Medal MMM Unitas (Unity) Medal Good Service Medal

Lieutenant General Ben Raubenheimer SD SM MMM is a retired South African Army officer who served as Chief of Staff Finance for the South African Defence Force from 1993 and South African National Defence Force in 1994 before his retirement in 1999.

== Army career ==
He was appointed CEO of Project Coast. He was promoted to Lieutenant General in 1993.

== Awards and decorations ==
- Southern Cross Decoration (SD)
- Southern Cross Medal (1975) (SM)
- Military Merit Medal (MMM)
- Unitas (Unity) Medal
- Good Service Medal (Gold (30 Years))
- Good Service Medal (Silver (20 Years))
- Good Service Medal (Bronze (10 Years))

Military offices
Preceded by Paul Murray	Chief of Staff Finance; 1993–1997	Succeeded by Renamed and Moved to Defence Secretariat
Preceded by Established at Defence Secretariat 1 April 1997	Chief of Finance; 1997–1999	Succeeded by Jack Grundling
