= Peter Tomlinson (admiral) =

Rear Admiral Peter A.H. Tomlinson SM
- Died: 13 September 2012
- Spouse: Shirley Metelerkamp
- Military career
- Allegiance: South Africa
- Branch: South African Navy
- Rank: Rear Admiral
- Commands: Chief of Naval Staff Operations; SAS Walvisbaai
- Awards: Southern Cross Medal SM Good Service Medal Union Medal Order of May (Naval Merit)

Rear Admiral Peter Tomlinson SM was a South African Navy officer.

He attended school at Diocesan College in Cape Town from 1936 until March 1941.

He joined the South African Air Force in World War II, serving in the motor boat flotilla. He only joined the SA Naval Forces (as the Navy was then known) as an Able Seaman in 1944. He was commissioned in 1945 and was one of sixty naval officers who joined the Permanent Force in 1946.

He was appointed Senior Officer Commanding in the Minesweeping Squadron and later Executive Officer of SAS President Pretorius from 1963 - 1965. Senior Staff Officer Personnel in 1965. Ashore he served as Acting Director of Personnel and as South Africa’s attaché in Argentina as well as Chief of Naval Staff (Personnel) from 1 July 1974 and Chief of Naval Staff Operations from 1978 to 1982.

== Honours and awards ==
He was awarded the Southern Cross Medal and the National Order of Merit (Paraguay)(Commander) and the Order of Naval Merit (Argentina).

- Southern Cross Medal (1952) (SM)
- Good Service Medal (Gold (30 Years))
- Good Service Medal (Silver (20 Years))
- Good Service Medal (Bronze (10 Years))
- Union Medal
- Order of May (Naval Merit) (Knight) (Note: Spanish: Orden de Mayo (Al Mérito Naval) - Caballero) (Argentina)
- Commander of the National Order of Merit (Paraguay)

== Notes ==
Military offices
Preceded by Jaap Weideman	Chief of Naval Staff Operations; 1978–1982	Succeeded by Glen Syndercombe
