= Hillcrest Commando =

Hillcrest Commando Regiment
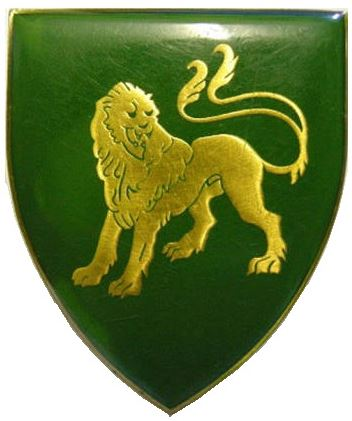
- Hillcrest Commando Regiment emblem
- Country: South Africa
- Allegiance: Republic of South Africa; Republic of South Africa
- Branch: South African Army; South African Army
- Type: Infantry
- Role: Light Infantry
- Size: One Battalion
- Part of: South African Infantry Corps; Army Territorial Reserve
- Garrison/HQ: Hillcrest, Gauteng
- Motto: "Vincit Virtus" (English: Excellence prevails)

Commanders
- Last OC: Lt Col Brenton Geach

Hillcrest Commando was a light infantry regiment of the South African Army. It formed part of the South African Army Infantry Formation as well as the South African Territorial Reserve. Hillcrest was a Commando from 1962 to 1983 and was the first English commando in Pretoria. Hillcrest was however a Regiment from 1983 to 2003.

== Origin ==
=== Hillcrest's two tailed lion ===
Hillcrest was an exclusive English speaking unit, but on the Minister of Defense's persistence that they should speak both official languages it was decided to " instead of one tail, our lion will have two tails as the Minister insisted". This is a play on words as the Afrikaans word for languages is Tale.

== Operations ==
=== With the SADF ===
==== Area of Responsibility ====
As a commando, Hillcrest deployed as far north as Rhodesia.

==== Commando to Regiment ====
Hillcrest became a Regiment in 1983 whereafter it did border camps in the Far North Command.

Hillcrest was assigned to Group 29 at Ellisras and to the Soutpansberg Military Area near Messina as part of 73 Brigade and as part of Far North Command Pietersburg

In March 1994, the Regiment supplied platoons to assist the SADF in resolving the AWB/Bophuthatswana civil unrest.

In April 1994, the Regiment called up 3 companies for duty in the East Rand and Johannesburg after the 29 March Shell House massacre.

== With the SANDF ==
The Regiment was part of the first National Defence Force parade held in Pietersburg on 11 November 1994.

=== Amalgamation into Tshwane Regiment ===
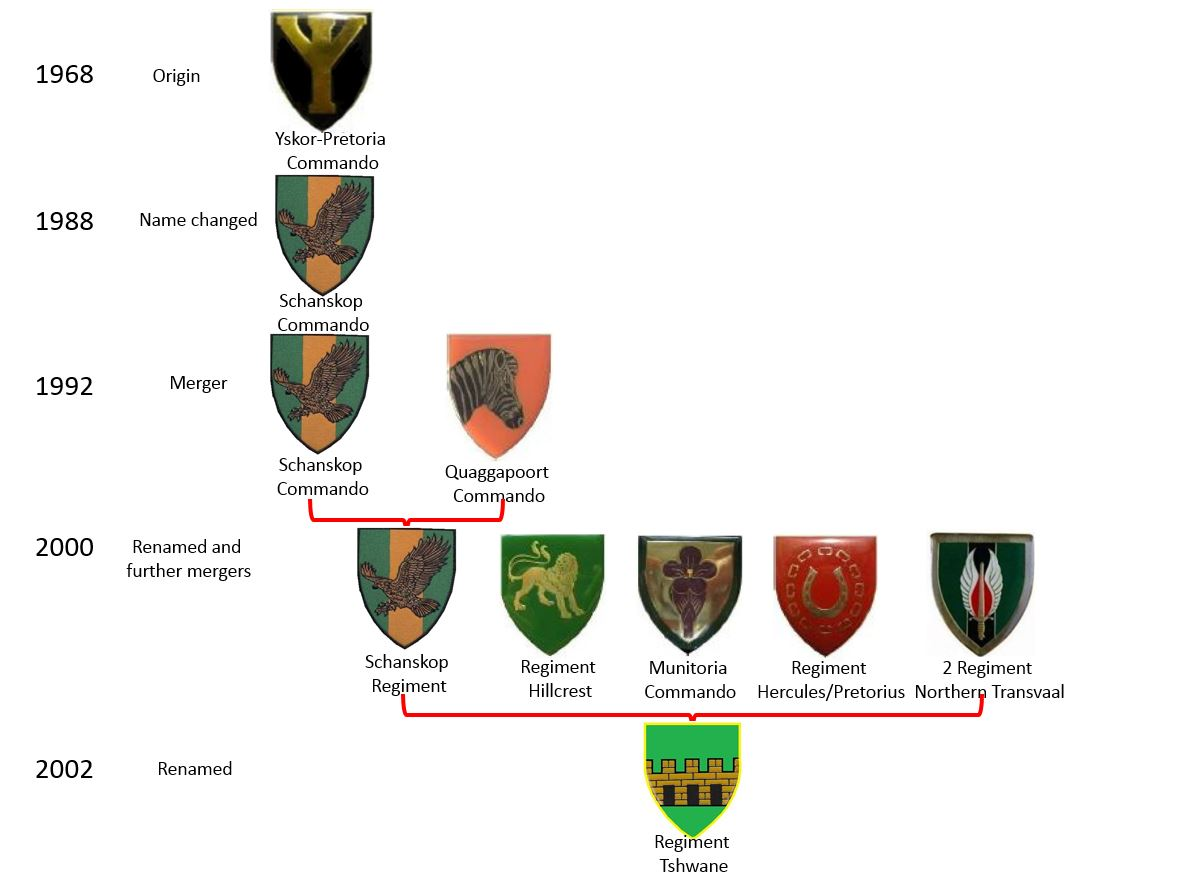
In December 2002, Regiment Hillcrest with other structures in the Greater Pretoria area was amalgamated into the new Tshwane Regiment.

== Leadership ==
- 1962: Cmdt M. Malone
- 1971 to 1984 RSM Willi Hook
- 1984: Cmdt W. Louw
- Last OC: Lt Col Brenton Geach
- 1994: RSM Tertius Zitzke

== Dress Insignia ==
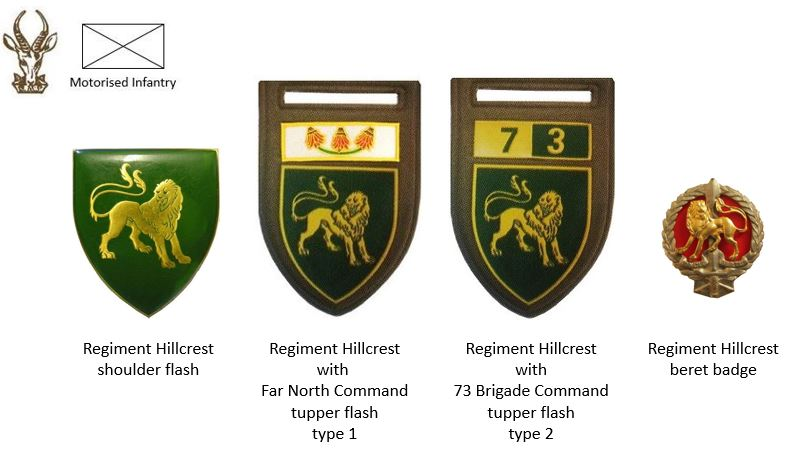
SADF era Hillcrest Regiment Insignia

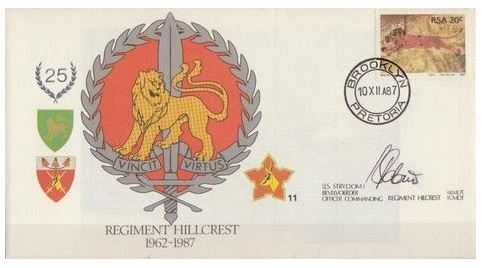
SADF Regiment Hillcrest commemorative letter

== See also ==
- South African Commando System
