= Andries Putter =

Vice Admiral Andries Petrus Putter SSAS SD MMM
- Born: 2 December 1935; Brits, Transvaal, Union of South Africa
- Died: 17 July 2014 (aged 78); Mossel Bay, Western Cape, South Africa
- Spouse: Gerda Fourie (Wife)
- Military career
- Allegiance: South Africa; South Africa
- Branch: South African Navy
- Service years: 1954–1990
- Rank: Vice Admiral
- Nickname: Dries
- Commands: Chief of the Navy; Chief of Naval Staff; SAS Pretoria
- Awards

Vice Admiral Andries Petrus Putter SSAS SD MMM (2 December 1935 – 17 July 2014) was a South African military commander who served as Chief of the South African Navy twice, first from 1982 to 1985 and again from 1989 to 1990. He was born in Brits in 1935.

== Military career ==
He joined the South African Navy in 1954 He completed a year’s training at the Saldanha Naval Gymnasium in the same year. He completed a Bachelor of Science Degree through the University of Stellenbosch, as the Military Academy had not yet been established. He attended a torpedo anti-submarine course in England, before joining the Frigate SAS President Kruger as a torpedo anti-submarine officer. He went to England for the building of the SAS President Pretorius and served as the ASW officer until 1966 when he was appointed OC of the Naval Anti Submarine School. He was then appointed Staff Officer Training until 1969 when he commanded the SAS Port Elizabeth and became Senior Officer of the Minesweeper Flotilla. He then served as Staff Officer Anti Submarine Warfare at Naval HQ before attending the Joint Staff Course at the National Defense College. On completing the course he remained on staff until 1977 when he was appointed to the staff of the Chief of the SADF, where he stayed for three years. He was promoted to Commodore in October 1979 and returned to the Navy as Officer Commanding Naval Command Natal. He briefly returned to Defence staff before being promoted to Rear Admiral and in 1982 he was appointed Chief of Naval Staff Operations, and in 1985 as the Chief of the Navy.

In 1985, he was appointed as Chief of Defence Intelligence, and in 1989, was appointed Chief of the Navy again. Following the Border War, the Navy budget was drastically reduced and Putter made the decision to retrench a large number of personnel.

He retired from the Navy shortly afterwards in 1990. He died at the Bayview Hospital in Mossel Bay on 17 July 2014.

== Awards and decorations ==
- Star of South Africa (Silver) (SSAS)
- Southern Cross Medal (1975) (SM)
- Military Merit Medal (MMM)
- Pro Patria Medal
- Good Service Medal (Gold (30 Years))
- Good Service Medal (Silver (20 Years))
- Permanent Force Good Service Medal
- Order of the Cloud and Banner (2^{nd} Grade - with Grand Cordon) (ORB) (Taiwan)
- Order of the Cloud and Banner (4^{th} Grade - with Special Cravat) (ORB) (Taiwan)
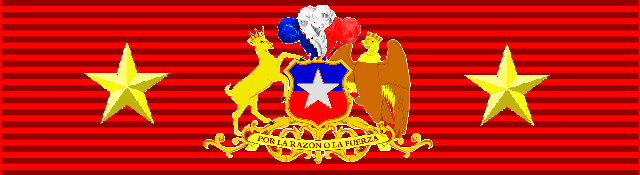
- Chilean Grand Officer II Class

== See also ==
- List of South African military chiefs

Military offices
Preceded by Glen Syndercombe	Chief of the South African Navy; 1989–1990	Succeeded by Lambert Woodburne
Preceded by Pieter van der Westhuizen	Chief of Staff Intelligence; 1985–1989	Succeeded by Witkop Badenhorst
Preceded by Ronald A. Edwards	Chief of the South African Navy; 1982–1985	Succeeded by Glen Syndercombe
