= Glen Syndercombe =

South African naval officer (1931–2005)

Vice Admiral Glen Syndercombe SSA, SD, SOE, SM, MMM, SAN (Rtd)
- Born: 17 November 1931; Cape Town, South Africa
- Died: 18 July 2005 (aged 73); Cape Town, South Africa
- Relatives: CAROLE-ANN ALICE LANGEVELD {{https://www.ancestry.com/search/collections/1030/?name=_Langeveldt&name_x=_1&pcat=42&qh=d3WKJyhwULqHwCm9RKIWKA%3D%3D}}
- Military career
- Allegiance: South Africa; South Africa
- Branch: South African Navy
- Service years: 1960–1989
- Rank: Vice Admiral
- Commands: Chief of the South African Navy; SAS Scorpion; SAS Jan van Riebeeck
- Awards
- Other work: Honorary Colonel

Vice Admiral Glen Syndercombe SSA SD SOE SM MMM SAN (Rtd) (17 November 1931 – 18 July 2005) was a former Chief of the South African Navy.

Born in Cape Town, Syndercomb attended school in Sea Point. His nautical career began in January 1948 with a two-year cadetship at the SA Nautical College General Botha.

== Early career ==
His seagoing career began in the British merchant service in 1950 as a cadet, and his first command came 10 years later in South Africa's Department of Sea Fisheries when he was appointed master of the fisheries survey vessel, Sardinops.

In 1959 he managed to fit in a course of studies at the University of Southampton before transferring from the merchant service to the SA Navy in 1960 as a junior officer.

== Naval career ==
- Joined S.A.Navy as lieutenant in 1960.
- 1960 – 1963 Navigation officer SAS Walvis Bay and SAS Good Hope.
- 1963 – 1964 Long ND course, HMS Dryad.
- 1964 – 1966 Squadron navigation officer of 10 Frigate Squadron in SAS President Steyn (F147).
- 1966 – 1969 Officer in Charge SAN Radar School in Durban.
- 1969 – 1972 Project officer. Promoted to commander.

In October 1972 he became commanding officer of the destroyer SAS Jan van Riebeeck for two years before being appointed Senior Staff Officer Operations on the staff of the Commander of Naval Operations. This was followed by a one-year stint as a project officer for the Strike Craft project and then as commanding officer of the newly formed strike craft squadron from June 1976, in the rank of captain. In 1979 he completed the Special Joint Staff Course at the South African Defence College and in January 1980 was appointed Director of Naval Operations and promoted to Commodore In October 1982 he became a rear admiral and Chief of Naval Staff Operations.

In 1985 he was promoted to vice admiral and appointed Chief of the S.A. Navy.

== Honours and awards ==
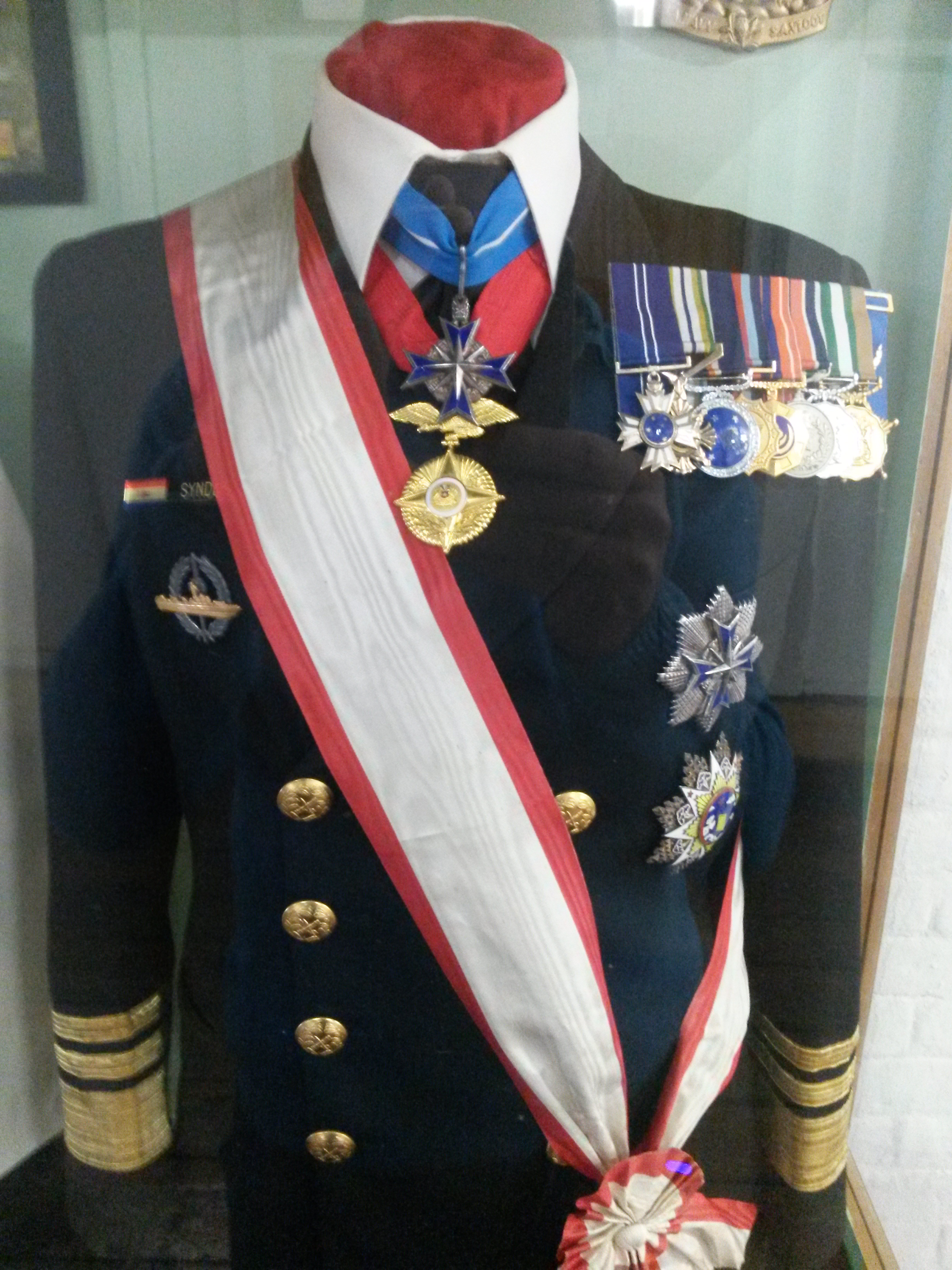
His uniform on display at the Naval Museum

The following were awarded:

- Star of South Africa (Silver) (SSAS)
- Southern Cross Decoration (SD)
- South African Police Star for Outstanding Service (SOE)
- Southern Cross Medal (1952) (SM)
- Military Merit Medal (MMM)
- Pro Patria Medal
- General Service Medal (South Africa)
- Good Service Medal (Silver (20 Years))
- Good Service Medal (Bronze (10 Years))
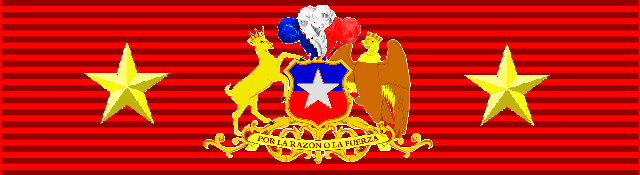
- Chilean Grand Officer II Class
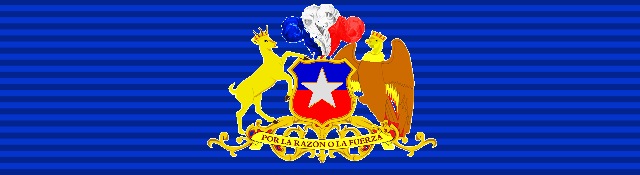
- Chilean Star of Military Merit
- Order of the Cloud and Banner (2^{nd} Grade - with Grand Cordon) (ORB)

== See also ==
- List of South African military chiefs

Military offices
Preceded by Andries Putter	Chief of the South African Navy; 1985–1989	Succeeded by Andries Putter
Preceded by Peter Tomlinson	Chief of Naval Operations; 1982–1985	Succeeded by James Sleigh
