= Marthinus Bekker =

South African Navy officer (1933–2022)

Marthinus Albertus Bekker SSA SD SM MMM
- Born: 1933
- Died: August 4, 2022 (aged 88–89)
- Spouse: Eleanor Winifred Johnson
- Military career
- Allegiance: South Africa
- Branch: South African Navy
- Rank: Vice Admiral
- Nickname: Bert
- Commands: Chief of SADF Staff
- Awards

Vice Admiral Marthinus Bekker SSA SD SM MMM (born 1933) was a South African Navy officer who served as Chief of the SADF Staff.

== Naval career ==
He joined the Navy in 1957 and served on the SAS Vrystaat before being transferred to England to join the shipbuilding program for the President class frigates.

He also served as Chief Paymaster, Director of Logistics Systems and Quartermaster General (1976 – 1982).

He was later appointed the Minister of Finance for the Ciskei homeland in 1992.

He was appointed Chief of the SADF Staff, replacing Kat Liebenberg. Before that he served as Chief of Staff Finances.

== Awards and decorations ==
- Star of South Africa (Gold) (SSAG)
- Southern Cross Decoration (SD)
- Southern Cross Medal (1975) (SM)
- Military Merit Medal (MMM)
- General Service Medal (South Africa)
- Good Service Medal (Gold (30 Years))
- Good Service Medal (Silver (20 Years))
- Permanent Force Good Service Medal
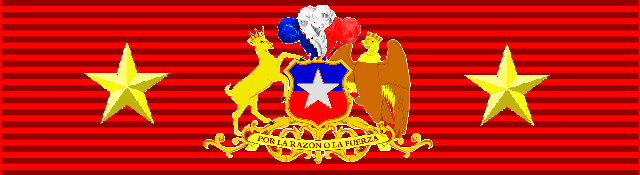
- Order of Military Merit (Grand Officer II) (Brazil)
- Order of the Cloud and Banner (3^{rd} Grade - with Yellow Grand Cordon) (ORB) (Taiwan)

Military offices
Preceded by Andreas Liebenberg	Chief of Defence Force Staff; 1990 – 1992	Succeeded by Pierre Steyn
Preceded by Willem J. Bergh	Chief of Staff Finance; 1983 – 1990	Succeeded by Paul Murray
Preceded by JJ Steenkamp	Quartermaster General SADF; 1976 – 1982	Succeeded by Kenneth Pickersgill
