= South African Army College =

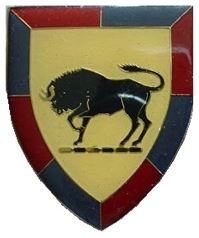
- South African Army College emblem
- Active: 1968 to present
- Country: South Africa
- Allegiance: South Africa
- Branch: South African Army
- Role: Training
- Garrison/HQ: Centurion, Gauteng, Thaba Tshwane, previously Voortrekkerhoogte
- Motto(s): Paratus (Preparedness)

The South African Army College is a training unit of the South African Army.

== History ==
=== Origin of military training in South Africa ===
South African military training can be traced back to 1786 when the Militere Kweekskool was established by the Dutch East India Company to develop local cadets, but collapsed due to lack of funds.

Under the Union of South Africa’s Defence Act of 1912, allowance was made for a formal South African Military College. Two branches were initially set up namely the General Branch or military school and the Musketry Branch or musketry school.

Both branches were initially housed in Bloemfontein in the Free State. The military school received its first intake in that same year and by 1913 the musketry school began its first rifle instruction course. The school of musketry eventually became the Weapon Training Branch of the College. Another school was opened for signals training, also in Bloemfontein. All schools eventually were housed on Tempe and placed under a single command.

At this stage the unit became known as the South African Military Schools and was now composed of:

- General Military Instruction,
- Musketry,
- Signals and
- Medical Training.

=== World War One impact ===
On the outbreak of WWI, training staff were transferred for mobilisation training at Potchefstroom and some served overseas.

=== Developments in the 1920s and 30s ===
By the 1920s the unit was re-established at Roberts Heights near Pretoria and renamed the South African Military School. By 1923, a commissioning course was held, resulting in the school being declared a proper College.

==== The Air Force connection ====
An additional wing, the Air Staff Wing was opened for the development of personnel for the emerging South African Air Force, which did not have a training institution of its own at that stage.

==== Training expansion ====
By 1939, a further six branches had been created:

- Physical Training
- Camouflaging,
- Armour,
- Chemical Warfare,
- Regimental and
- Commando

=== World War II ===
Approximately 150 000 students of all ranks received training at the Army College during the war. Several branches had also become schools in their own right and had moved to premises across South Africa. For example, Signals moved Potchefstroom becoming the Signals Training Centre. By the end of the war however, some branches such as the Chemical Warfare branch had been disbanded.

=== Training Developments after the War ===
Branches such as Administration and Ordnance started in the 1950s while joint training between the Army and Air Force came to an end with the eventual establishment of its Air Force College. In 1953 the Weapon Training Branch was redesignated the Infantry School; see South African Infantry School.

By the 1960s, Intelligence, Nuclear, Biological and Chemical branches was established as well. The Infantry School had moved to Oudtshoorn in the Cape.

=== Name Change ===
In 1968 the Chief of the Army changed the name of the unit to the South African Army College in order for it to fully develop its now uniquely Army character.

== Insignia ==
The wildebeest as the College’s symbol had been adopted around 1924. A shoulder flash was developed around 1963 displaying the wildebeest in a roundel of blue and maroon. The Wildebeest concept had originated from a trophy given to the Military School from the Mounted Rifles.

=== SADF era Dress Insignia ===
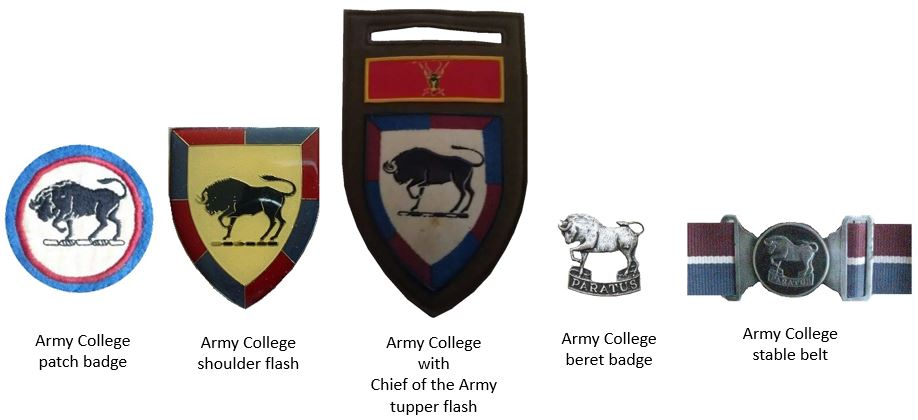
SADF era Army College insignia

=== Notable commandants ===
Note: Last attained rank of incumbent is used

- Maj Gen Evered Poole - later Deputy Chief of Staff, Union Defence Force
- Lt Gen Willem Louw - later Chief of the Army
- Gen Constand Viljoen - later Chief of SADF
- Lt Gen Koos Bisschoff - later Chief of Staff Plans
- Lt Gen Wessel Kritzinger - later Chief of Staff Operations
- Lt Gen Thabiso Mokhosi - later Chief of the Army
- Lt Gen Xolani Ndhlovu - later Chief of Logistics
