= Paul Murray (admiral) =

South African Navy officer (born 1941)

Vice Admiral Paul Murray SSAS SD SM MMM
- Born: 16 April 1941 (age 85)
- Military career
- Allegiance: South Africa
- Branch: South African Navy
- Service years: –1993
- Rank: Vice Admiral
- Commands: Chief of Staff Finance; Chief Director Finance
- Awards: Star of South Africa SSAS Southern Cross Decoration SD Southern Cross Medal SM Military Merit Medal MMM Good Service Medal Order of the Cloud and Banner ORB

Vice Admiral Paul Murray SSAS SD SM MMM is a retired South African Navy officer who served as Chief of Staff Finance for the South African Defence Force before his retirement in 1993.

== Naval career ==
Paul Murray was a surface combat officer who served as a Bridge Watchkeeping Officer, Gunnery Officer and Executive Officer aboard various vessels. He later served as Director Budgeting and Programming for the SADF. He served as Chief Director Finances under V Adm Marthinus Bekker.

He was promoted to vice admiral in 1990.

He was promoted to rear admiral on 1 January 1989 and appointed Chief Director:Finances at SADF Headquarters.

== Awards and decorations ==
He was awarded the Star of South Africa, Silver in the 1994 National Honours.

- Star of South Africa (Silver) (SSAS)
- Southern Cross Decoration (SD)
- Southern Cross Medal (1975) (SM)
- Military Merit Medal (MMM)
- Good Service Medal (Gold (30 Years))
- Good Service Medal (Silver (20 Years))
- Good Service Medal (Bronze (10 Years))
- Order of the Cloud and Banner (4^{th} Grade - with Special Cravat) (ORB)
- Spanish Army Medical Service Medal

Military offices
| Preceded by Marthinus Bekker | Chief of Staff Finance; 1990–1993 | Succeeded by Ben Raubenheimer |
