= Witkop Badenhorst =

South African Army general

Lieutenant General Rudolf Badenhorst SSAS, SD, SM, MMM
- Born: Rudolph Badenhorst; 1940
- Died: 10 November 2012 (aged 71–72); George, Western Cape
- Burial place: George, Western Cape
- Spouse: Ina Badenhorst (died 2012)
- Military career
- Allegiance: South Africa
- Branch: South African Army
- Rank: Lieutenant General
- Nickname: Witkop
- Commands: Chief of Staff Intelligence
- Wars: Border War
- Awards: Star of South Africa SSAS Southern Cross Decoration SD Southern Cross Medal SM Military Merit Medal MMM Pro Patria Medal Southern Africa Medal General Service Medal (South Africa) Good Service Medal

Lieutenant General Rudolf Badenhorst (1940 – 2012) was a South African Army general, who served as Chief of Staff Intelligence for the Defence Force. He died in 2012.

== Military career ==
He served as Deputy Chief of the Army from 1 November 1987 In 1989 he was appointed to the Military Intelligence Division as the Chief of Staff Intelligence, a post he held until 1991. Badenhorst left the army at his own request retiring in early 1991 after 30 years of service.

== Death ==
Badenhorst died on 10 November 2012 of pneumonia and heart failure at the George-Medi-clinic in George, Western Cape. He had outlived his wife Ina by less than a month and is survived by four children and eleven grandchildren.

== Awards and decorations ==
- Star of South Africa (Silver) (SSAS)
- Southern Cross Decoration (SD)
- Southern Cross Medal (1975) (SM)
- Military Merit Medal (MMM)
- Pro Patria Medal
- Southern Africa Medal
- General Service Medal (South Africa)
- Good Service Medal (Gold (30 Years))
- Good Service Medal (Silver (20 Years))
- Good Service Medal (Bronze (10 Years))

Military offices
| Preceded by Andries P Putter | Chief of Staff Intelligence; 1989–1991 | Succeeded by Joffel van der Westhuizen |
| Preceded by Jan van Loggerenberg | Chief of Staff Operations; 1988–1989 | Succeeded by Koos Bisschoff |
| Preceded by Dirk Marais | Deputy Chief of the Army; 1987–1988 | Succeeded by Len Meyer |
| Preceded by Johannes F Janse van Rensburg | Chief of Army Staff Logistics; 1982–1987 | Succeeded by Deon Mortimer |
| Preceded by Deon Mortimer | OC Infantry School; 1976–1979 | Succeeded by Wessel Kritzinger |
