= Gert Boshoff =

South African Army general

Lieutenant General Gert Johannes Jacobus Boshoff SSAS SD SM
- Born: 28 April 1931; Benoni
- Died: 22 October 2014 (aged 83); Centurion, Pretoria
- Spouse: Petronella Cornelis Jordaan
- Military career
- Allegiance: South Africa
- Branch: South African Army
- Rank: Lieutenant General
- Commands: Chief of Staff Personnel; Deputy Chief of Staff Personnel; OC North West Command; Director Signals; OC School of Signals
- Awards: Star of South Africa SSAS Southern Cross Decoration SD Southern Cross Medal SM Military Merit Medal MMM Pro Patria Medal Good Service Medal Permanent Force Good Service Medal
- Other work: Clergyman

Lieutenant General Gert Johannes Jacobus Boshoff SSAS SD SM (28 April 1931 – 22 October 2014) was a South African Army general.

He attended school at Barberton High School in the Eastern Transvaal but left at the age of 15 before joining the Post Office, later completing his Matric at the Pretoria Technical College in 1948 through evening classes.

In 1950 he started working for the City Council of Pretoria, and also joined the Citizen Force where he became part of 6 Signal Squadron.

As a Colonel he was appointed as Director Signals at Army HQ (26 January 1968 – 31 December 1972), and then promoted to Brigadier from 1 November 1968. On 4 December 1972 he was appointed OC North West Command. On 1 December 1974 he was promoted to the rank of Major General and appointed Chief of Army Staff Logistics. He was appointed Deputy Chief of Staff Personnel on 1 January 1979 and later that year on 1 December 1979 he was promoted to the rank of Lieutenant General in the position of Chief of Staff Personnel from 1 February 1980 till his retirement on 31 January 1981.

== Awards and decorations ==
- Star of South Africa (Silver) (SSAS)
- Southern Cross Decoration (SD)
- Southern Cross Medal (1952) (SM)
- Military Merit Medal (MMM)
- Pro Patria Medal
- Good Service Medal (Gold (30 Years))
- Good Service Medal (Silver (20 Years))
- Permanent Force Good Service Medal

Religious titles
Preceded by Apostle TJ Becker	Apostle of the Old Apostolic Church of KwaZulu Natal; 2001–2003	Succeeded by Apostle Vermaak
Military offices
Preceded by Ronald A. Edwards	Chief of Staff Personnel; 1980–1981	Succeeded by Raymond Holtzhausen
Preceded by Ronald A. Edwards	Deputy Chief of Staff Personnel; 1979	Succeeded by R Adm HP Botha
Preceded by Andre van Deventer	OC North Western Command; 1973–1974	Succeeded by Frans van den Berg
