= Gerrit Opperman =

Major General Gerrit Nicolaas Opperman SD SM MMM
- Born: 27 July 1945 (age 81); Johannesburg
- Military career
- Allegiance: South Africa
- Branch: South African Army
- Service years: c. 1966 – August 1996
- Rank: Major General
- Nickname: Gert
- Commands: OC Northern Transvaal Command; OC Sector 70 (Eastern Caprivi)
- Awards: Southern Cross Decoration SD Southern Cross Medal SM Military Merit Medal MMM Pro Patria Medal Southern Africa Medal General Service Medal (South Africa) Unitas (Unity) Medal Good Service Medal Order of Military Merit

Major General Gerrit Nicolaas Opperman (Gert) SD SM MMM SAStC was a General Officer in the South African Army.

== Early life ==
General Gert Opperman was born on 27 July 1945 in Johannesburg.

== Career ==
He served as spokesman for the Malan family on the death of Magnus Malan.

== Courses ==
- Escuala de Defensa National (Joint Warfare qualification) Completed 1975
- Escuela de Estado Mayor (Command and Staff qualification) Completed 1975

== Posts held ==
Gen Opperman has held the following posts:

- 2005 – present: Chief Executive Officer – The Research Trust
- 2003 – present: Managing Director – VTM Projects (Pty) Ltd, Pretoria
- 2003 – present: Executive Trustee – Voortrekker Monument Trust, Pretoria
- 2003 – present: Council Member – Voortrekker Museum
- 2002 – present: Chief Executive Officer – Heritage Foundation
- 1998 – 2000: Member – Gert Opperman Consulting cc
- 1996 – 1998: Managing Director – Guards Division, Coin Security Group
- 1994 – 1996: Chief Director – Corporate Communication, SANDF
- 1988 – 1993: OC Northern Transvaal Command, SANDF
- 1987 – 2000: Executive Chairman/Convenor, Club Gerbera
- 1983 – 1988: Military Secretary – DOD

== Awards ==
Maj Gen Opperman has received the following awards during his career:

=== Medals and decorations ===
- International Orders
- Southern Cross Decoration (SD)
- Southern Cross Medal (1975) (SM)
- Military Merit Medal (MMM)
- Pro Patria Medal
- Southern Africa Medal
- General Service Medal (South Africa)
- Unitas (Unity) Medal
- Good Service Medal (Gold (30 Years))
- Good Service Medal (Silver (20 Years))
- Good Service Medal (Bronze (10 Years))
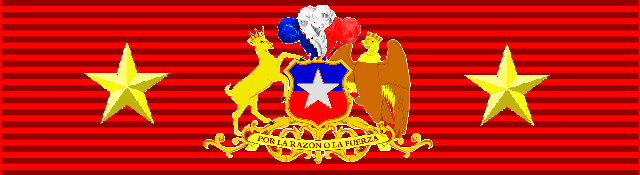
- Order of Military Merit (Grand Officer II) (Brazil)
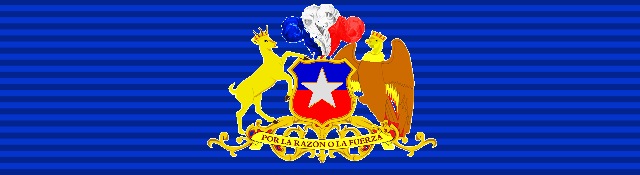
- Chilean Star of Military Merit

Military offices
Unknown	OC Northern Transvaal Command; 1988–1993	Succeeded by Hennie Schultz
Unknown	Chief Director – Corporate Communication, SANDF; 1994–1996	Succeeded by Andrew Masondo
Unknown	Military Secretary – DOD; 1983–1988	Succeeded by Roelf Beukes
