= Quaggapoort Commando =

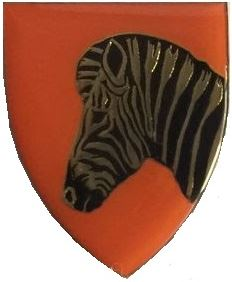
- Quaggapoort Commando emblem
- Country: South Africa
- Allegiance: Republic of South Africa; Republic of South Africa
- Branch: South African Army; South African Army
- Type: Infantry
- Role: Light Infantry
- Size: One Battalion
- Part of: South African Infantry Corps; Army Territorial Reserve
- Garrison/HQ: Quaggapoort, Northern Pretoria

Quaggapoort Commando was a light infantry regiment of the South African Army. It formed part of the South African Army Infantry Formation as well as the South African Territorial Reserve.

== History ==
=== Operations ===
==== With the SADF ====
During this era, the unit was mainly used for area force protection, search and cordones as well as stock theft control assistance to the rural police.

==== With the SANDF ====
===== Amalgamation =====
Over the years several commando units and regiments, such as Hillcrest, Munitoria, Regiments Pretorius as well as 2 Regiment Noord-Transvaal were amalgamated with Regiment Schanskop.

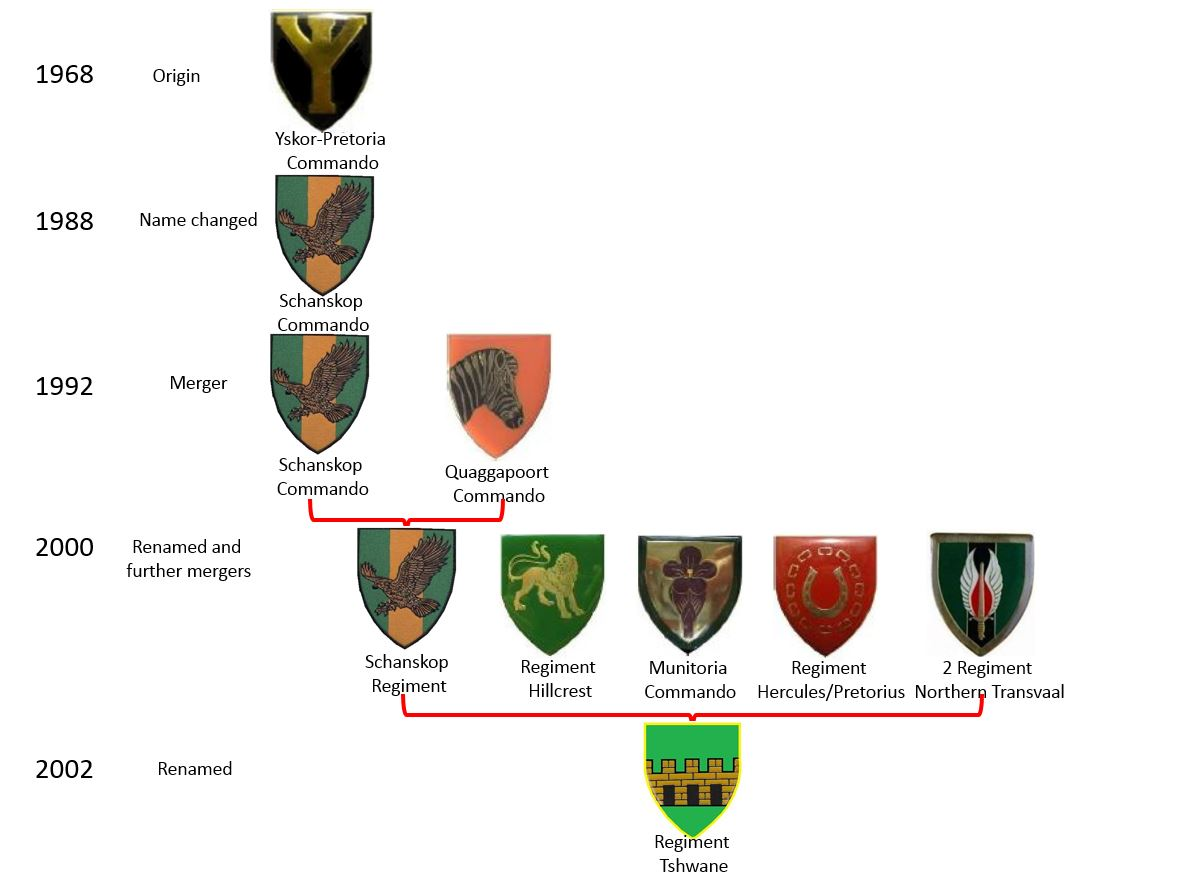
SANDF History of Tshwane Regiment

In December 2002, the name "Tshwane Regiment" was approved to be in line with the area where the Regiment is situated.

===== Disbandment =====
The remaining commando units not amalgamated into the new Army Reserve were disbanded after a decision by South African President Thabo Mbeki to disband all Commando Units. The Commando system was phased out between 2003 and 2008 "because of the role it played in the apartheid era", according to the Minister of Safety and Security Charles Nqakula.

== Insignia ==
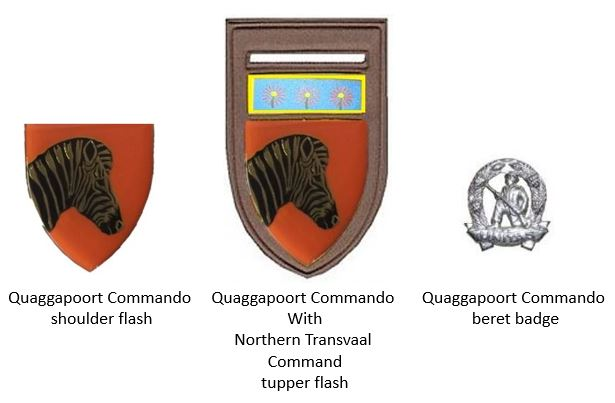
SADF era Quaggapoort Commando insignia

== See also ==
- South African Commando System
