= Laura Janse van Vuuren =

South African Navy officer

Rear Admiral (JG) Laura Janse van Vuuren
- Military career
- Allegiance: South Africa
- Branch: South African Navy
- Service years: 1977–2014
- Rank: Rear Admiral (JG)
- Commands: South African National Defence College
- Awards: General Service Medal (South Africa) Unitas (Unity) Medal Medalje vir Troue Diens (Medal for Loyal Service) Good Service Medal

Rear Admiral (Junior Grade) Laura Janse van Vuuren is a South African Navy officer and the second woman to reach flag rank.

Janse van Vuuren completed her schooling at Zwaanswyk High School in 1976 and joined the Navy in 1977. She initially entered the Navy as a non-commissioned officer and then completed the officer's course in 1979.

In 2006 Janse van Vuuren was appointed as Director Equity Strategic Direction for the SANDF and promoted to rear admiral (JG). She was then appointed commandant of the South African National Defence College at Thaba Tshwane from 1 January 2011.

== Honours and awards ==
- General Service Medal (South Africa)
- Unitas (Unity) Medal
- Medalje vir Troue Diens (Medal for Loyal Service) (30 Year Clasp)
- Good Service Medal (Silver (20 Years))
- Good Service Medal (Bronze (10 Years))
- National Defence Medal (Gold) France

Military offices
| Preceded by CD Schoeman | Commandant Defence College; 2011–2012 | Succeeded by Gordon Yekelo |
