= Len Meyer =

South African general

Lieutenant General Leonard Alexander Meyer SD, SM, MMM
- Born: Leonard Alexander Meyer
- Military career
- Allegiance: South Africa
- Branch: South African Army
- Rank: Lieutenant General
- Nickname: Len
- Unit: 1 SA Infantry Battalion
- Commands: Chief of Staff Personnel; Deputy Chief of the Army; Director Infantry; OC 1 South African Infantry Battalion
- Conflicts: South African Border War
- Awards: Southern Cross Decoration SD Southern Cross Medal SM Military Merit Medal MMM Pro Patria Medal Good Service Medal Permanent Force Good Service Medal

Lieutenant General Len Meyer was a South African Army general, who served as Chief of Staff Personnel for the Defence Force.

== Military career ==
He matriculated from Outeniqua High School and after joining the South African Defence Force, he served as a company commander at 2 SA Infantry Battalion Group at Walvis Bay, as OC 1 SA Infantry Battalion at Oudtshoorn, He was also Director Infantry. Deputy Chief of the Army from 1988 to 1989. In 1989, he was appointed to the Defence Headquarters as the Chief of Staff Personnel, a post he held until 1991.

== Awards and decorations ==
- Southern Cross Decoration (SD)
- Southern Cross Medal (1952) (SM)
- Military Merit Medal (MMM)
- Pro Patria Medal
- Good Service Medal (Gold (30 Years))
- Good Service Medal (Silver (20 Years))
- Permanent Force Good Service Medal

Military offices
Preceded by Lt Gen Raymond Holtzhausen	Chief of Staff Personnel; 1989–1991	Succeeded by Lt Gen Pierre Steyn
Preceded by Maj Gen Witkop Badenhorst	Deputy Chief of the Army; 1988–1989	Succeeded by Maj Gen Georg Meiring
