= Wessel Kritzinger =

South African Army general (born 1944)

Lieutenant General Wessel Gerhard Kritzinger SD SM MMM
- Born: 1942; Uitenhage
- Died: 2024 (age 82)
- Military career
- Allegiance: South Africa; South Africa
- Branch: South African Army
- Service years: 1965–1997
- Rank: Lieutenant General
- Unit: 2 South African Infantry Battalion
- Commands: Chief of Staff Operations; GOC Witwatersrand Command; OC Eastern Province Command; OC 2 South African Infantry Battalion
- Conflicts: Border War
- Awards: Southern Cross Decoration SD Southern Cross Medal SM Military Merit Medal MMM Pro Patria Medal Southern Africa Medal General Service Medal (South Africa) Unitas (Unity) Medal Good Service Medal

Lieutenant General Wessel Kritzinger SD SM MMM (1942 – 2024) was a South African Army general, who served as Chief of Staff Operations for the Defence Force.

== Military career ==
He was a qualified military parachutist and served as the OC Infantry School, OC Eastern Province Command, GOC Wits Command before being appointed to the DHQ as the Chief of Staff Operations in 1992 - 1997. He retired at the end of July 1997.

== Awards and decorations ==
- Southern Cross Decoration (SD)
- Southern Cross Medal (1975) (SM)
- Military Merit Medal (MMM)
- Pro Patria Medal
- Southern Africa Medal
- General Service Medal (South Africa)
- Unitas (Unity) Medal
- Good Service Medal (Gold (30 Years))
- Good Service Medal (Silver (20 Years))
- Good Service Medal (Bronze (10 Years))

Military offices
Preceded by Koos Bisschoff	Chief of Staff Operations; 1992–1997	Succeeded by Deon Ferreira as Chief of Joint Operations (est as independent div)
Preceded by Joffel van der Westhuizen	GOC Witwatersrand Command; 1990–1992	Succeeded by Vos Benade
Preceded by Joffel van der Westhuizen	OC Eastern Province Command; 1987–1990	Succeeded by Bertie Botha
Preceded by Koos Bisschoff	OC Army College; 1981–1983	Succeeded by Anton van Graan
Preceded by Witkop Badenhorst	OC Infantry School; 1980–1981	Succeeded by Chris Serfontein
