= Munitoria Commando =

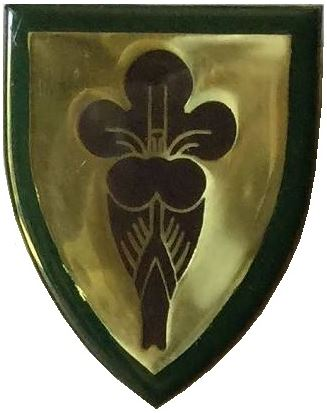
- Munitoria Commando emblem
- Country: South Africa
- Allegiance: Republic of South Africa; Republic of South Africa
- Branch: South African Army; South African Army
- Type: Infantry
- Role: Light Infantry
- Size: One Battalion
- Part of: South African Infantry Corps; Army Territorial Reserve
- Garrison/HQ: Pretoria CBD
- Motto: Praesto Pro Patria (Ready for my country)

Munitoria Commando was a light infantry regiment of the South African Army. It formed part of the South African Army Infantry Formation as well as the South African Territorial Reserve.

== History ==
=== Origin ===
Munitoria Commando was originally affiliated to Hercules Commando an industrial commando.

=== Operations ===
==== With the SADF ====
The unit remained a company-sized unit and was housed within the lines of Hercules Commando under command of Group 15.

By 1983 the unit was given authority to become a fully fledged unit in its own right and it assumed the role of a reaction unit for the Northern Transvaal Command. By then its HQ had moved to the old German School building in Skinner Street, Pretoria.

==== With the SANDF ====
===== Amalgamation =====
Over the years several commando units and regiments, such as Hillcrest, Munitoria, Regiments Pretorius as well as 2 Regiment Noord-Transvaal were amalgamated with Regiment Schanskop.

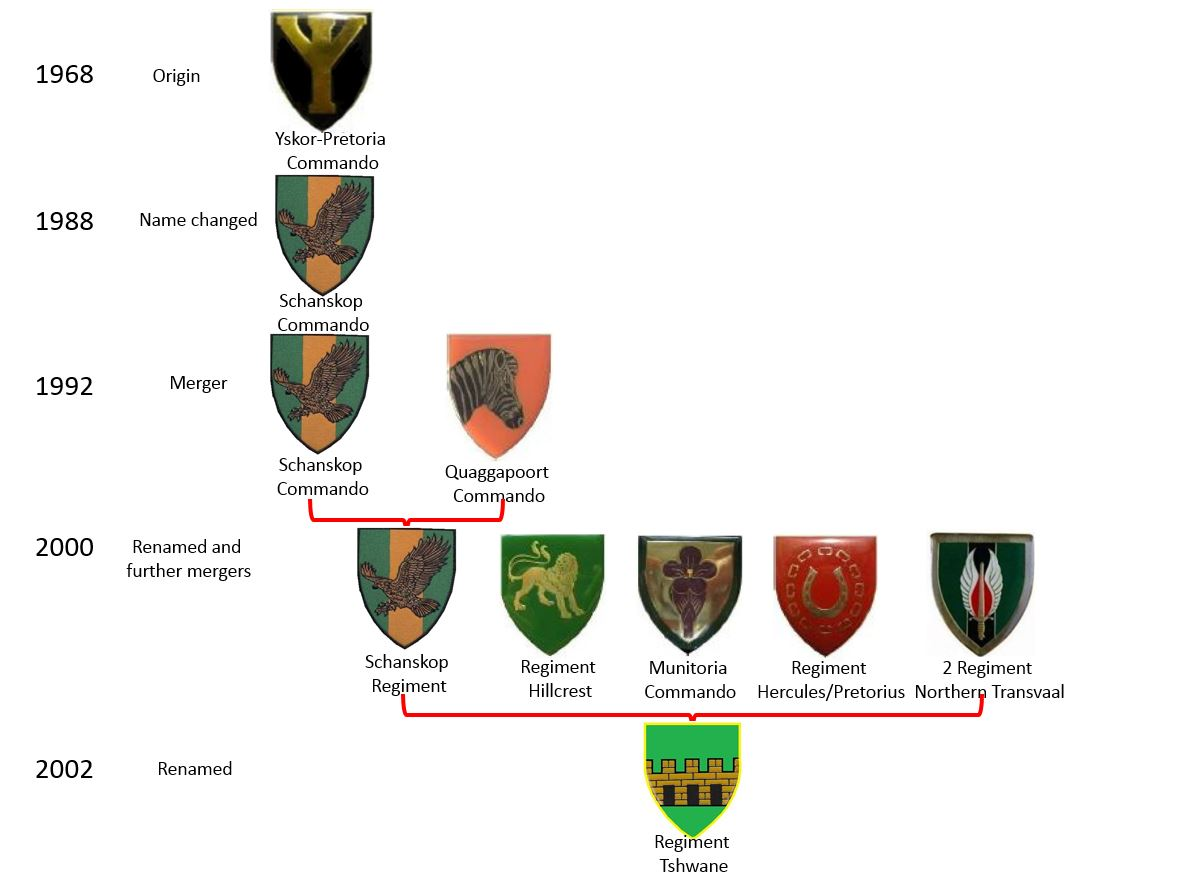
SANDF History of Tshwane Regiment

In December 2002, the name "Tshwane Regiment" was approved to be in line with the area where the Regiment is situated.

===== Disbandment =====
The remaining commando units Commando units not amalgamated were disbanded after a decision by South African President Thabo Mbeki to disband all Commando Units. The Commando system was phased out between 2003 and 2008 "because of the role it played in the apartheid era", according to the Minister of Safety and Security Charles Nqakula.

== Insignia ==
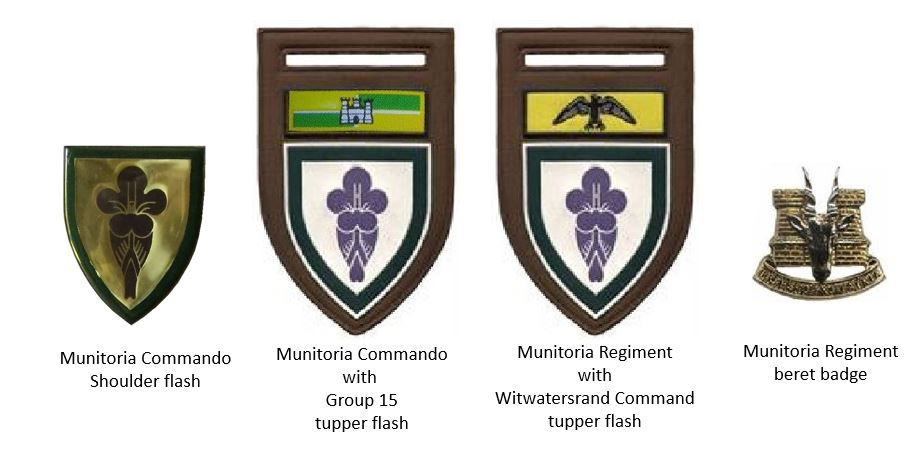
SADF era Munitoria Commando insignia

== See also ==
- South African Commando System
