= Willem Louw =

South African army general

Lieutenant General Willem Petrus Louw SSA SM
- Born: 24 November 1920; Bloemhof, South Africa
- Died: 4 July 1980 (aged 59)
- Burial place: Voortrekkerhoogte, Pretoria, Gauteng, New Military cemetery 25.78148°S 28.12166°E
- Military career
- Allegiance: Republic of South Africa
- Branch: South African Army
- Service years: 1938–1975
- Rank: Lieutenant General
- Commands: Inspector General of the SADF; Chief of the Army; Northern Transvaal Command; SA Military College; 1 Parachute Battalion
- Wars: World War II
- Awards

Lieutenant-General Willem Petrus Louw SSA SM (Bloemhof, 24 November 1920 – 4 July 1980) was a South African military commander. He joined the South African Army in the Special Service Battalion in 1938, and served in Italy in World War II.

== Military career ==
After enlisting as a private, he served as an NCO in the Technical Service Corps (SAOC) and was seconded to the South African Infantry. In 1943 he attended a Candidate Officers' course and was appointed a 2nd Lieutenant in the South African Army Armoured Corps. He was transferred to the 6th Armoured Division and deployed to the Middle East and Italy.

After the war, he served in various posts and in 1959 became Officer Commanding North West Cape Command In 1960 he attended a Parachute Instructors' course in England. He was promoted to Commandant (Lieutenant Colonel) in January 1961 and in April 1961 became the founder and first commanding officer of 1 Parachute Battalion. He was promoted to Colonel in 1964 and appointed OC of the Military College in Voortrekkerhoogte. In 1966 he served as OC Northern Transvaal Command as a Brigadier and Chief of the Army from 1967 to 1973, and as Inspector-General of the South African Defence Force from 1973 to 1975.

After a re-organisation of the SADF, the position of Inspector General was abolished and he retired on 31 March 1975.

== Awards and decorations ==
- Star of South Africa (1952) (SSA) – 1974
- Southern Cross Medal (1952) (SM) – 1962
- Queen Elizabeth II Coronation Medal
- Union Medal
- 1939–45 Star
- Italy Star
- Defence Medal (United Kingdom)
- War Medal 1939–1945
- Africa Service Medal (WWII)

== See also ==
- List of South African military chiefs
- South African Army

Military offices
Preceded by Maj Gen Fritz Loots	Inspector General of the SADF; 1973–1975	Post Abolished
Preceded by Charles 'Pop' Fraser	Chief of the South African Army; 1967–1973	Succeeded by Magnus Malan
Preceded by Brig JH Burgher	OC Northern Transvaal Command; 1966–1967	Succeeded by Brig FJ van Deventer
Preceded by Col JH Burgher	OC South African Military College; 1964–1966	Succeeded by Col JW van Niekerk
New creation Regiment Founded	OC 1 Parachute Battalion; April 1961–1964	Succeeded by Jan Fourie
