= Koos Bisschoff =

South African military officer

Lieutenant General Jacobus Johannes Bisschoff SD SM MMM
- Born: 15 July 1938 (age 88)
- Died: Pretoria, Gauteng
- Spouse: Beatrix "Trix" Bisschoff
- Military career
- Allegiance: South Africa; South Africa
- Branch: South African Army
- Service years: 1957–1993
- Rank: Lieutenant General
- Nickname: Koos
- Unit: School of Artillery & Armour
- Commands: OC School of Artillery; OC North Western Command; GOC Eastern Transvaal Command; Chief of Staff Operations; Chief of Staff Planning
- Wars: Border War
- Awards: Southern Cross Decoration SD Southern Cross Medal SM Military Merit Medal MMM Pro Patria Medal Southern Africa Medal General Service Medal (South Africa) Good Service Medal
- Other work: Politics; Convener of the Freedom Front

Lieutenant General Koos Bisschoff SD SM MMM is a former artillery officer who served as Chief of Staff Planning in the SADF

== Early life ==
He was born in the Cape Province and matriculated from Trompsburg High School before joining the SA Army Gymnasium.

== Military career ==
He studied at the South African Military Academy from 1958 and graduated with a bachelor's degree in military science from Stellenbosch University. He was an instructor at the School of Artillery & Armour. He served as Directing Staff at the Army College. Cmdt Bisschoff was the Chief Instructor Staff Duties. Chief Military Instructor at the Military Academy in 1972–1973. He was promoted to rank of colonel in 1973 and served as Officer Commanding School of Artillery from 1973 - 1976. He saw action in the Border War as a Sector Commander. He was promoted to brigadier in 1980. Commandant Army College, OC North Western Command. He was promoted to major general in 1986. Inspector General SA Army in 1986. GOC Eastern Transvaal during 1987–1989. He was promoted to lieutenant general in 1990. Chief of Staff Operations of the staff of the Chief of the Defence Force from 1990 to 1992 and finally as Chief of Staff Planning from 1992 to 1993. until retirement in 1993. He died in 2009.

== Awards and decorations ==
- Southern Cross Decoration (SD)
- Southern Cross Medal (1975) (SM)
- Military Merit Medal (MMM)
- Pro Patria Medal
- Southern Africa Medal
- General Service Medal (South Africa)
- Good Service Medal (Gold (30 Years))
- Good Service Medal (Silver (20 Years))
- Good Service Medal (Bronze (10 Years))

Master Gunner #7
Master Gunner badge
Commandant; J.J. 'Koos' Bisschoff (Note: Post occupied when award was made: CISD, Army College)
Year: 1970
← #6; Major; Delville Linford	#8 → Major; Hugh R. Stempfie

== Notes ==
Military offices
Preceded by Lt Gen Dries van der Lith	Chief of Staff Planning; 1992–1993	Succeeded by Disbanded
Preceded by Lt Gen Witkop Badenhorst	Chief of Staff Operations; 1989–1992	Succeeded by Lt Gen Wessel Kritzinger
Preceded by Maj Gen Pieter Hanekom	IG SA Army; 1986	Succeeded by Maj Gen Hans Paetzold
Preceded by Col George Kruys	OC Army College; 1978–1980	Succeeded by Col Wessel Kritzinger
Preceded by Col Frans van den Berg	OC School of Artillery; 1973–1976	Succeeded by Col Paul Lombard
Honorary titles
Preceded by Maj Charles Wentzel	Master Gunner; 1970	Succeeded by Maj Hugh Stempfle
