= Charles Lloyd (South Africa) =

- Died: 20 December 2014
- Allegiance: South Africa
- Branch: South African Army
- Rank: Lieutenant General
- Commands: GOC Far North Command; GOC South West African Territorial Force (–9 November 1983); Secretary of the State Security Council (1988 – 1990)
- Conflicts: Border War; Operation Protea
- Spouse: Rieta

Lieutenant General Charles Lloyd was a General Officer in the South African Army. He died on 20 December 2014.

== Military career ==
“By July 1981 the campaign strategy for Operation Protea had been neatly packaged by Major General Charles Lloyd, General Officer Commanding South West Africa Territorial Force, at HQ Bastion in Windhoek. He was an outstanding commanding general, and I had immense regard for his ability in the fields of high command and strategic planning. Protea formed part of his stratification for the war in the Western Sub-Theatre – simply stated, the military plans which shaped the ends, ways and means of defeating the foe. His strategy was aligned with the SADF’s higher intention, which was to incapacitate SWAPO’s military forces in southern Angola”

— Maj Gen Roland de Vries in "In the eye of the firestorm"

General Lloyd commanded the South West African Territorial Force in the 1980s.

He was a major proponent of the "Winning the Hearts and Minds" (WHAM) strategy of counter-insurgency. He was also a key part of the development of the National Security Management System (NSMS) under Prime Minister P.W. Botha and served as secretary of the State Security Council from 1988 to 1990. He stated that the NSMS was concerned with three areas: the government, (for self-criticism and the correction of short comings), the enemy (to "command, coerce and eliminate") and the masses (whose support had to be won through communication and education). As secretary of the SSC, he essentially drove the State Security apparatus on a day-to-day basis.

He commanded Far North Command before handing over to Gen Georg Meiring in 1986.

He was in overall command of Operation Protea. General Roland de Vries later had this to say about General Lloyd: “From my point of view, the most important military leaders at that time were General Constand Viljoen, the Chief of the SADF and the founding father, so to speak, of 61 Mech; Lieutenant General Johannes Geldenhuys, Chief of the Army; and Major General Charles Lloyd, General Officer Commanding SWATF. It was my good fortune that all three were inspirational commanders who had a marked influence on shaping and building the best army in Africa”.

== See also ==
- South African Army
- South African Border War

Military offices
| Preceded by Pieter van der Westhuizen | Secretary of the State Security Council; 1988 – 1990 | Dissolved |
| Preceded by Johannes Geldenhuys | Chief of the South West African Territorial Force; 1981 – 9 Nov 1983 | Succeeded by Georg Meiring |
| Established | GOC Far North Command; 1983 – 1986 | Succeeded by Georg Meiring |
