= School of Infantry =

A School of Infantry provides training in weapons and infantry tactics to infantrymen of a nation's military forces.

Schools of infantry include:

Australia

- Australian Army – School of Infantry, Lone Pine Barracks at Singleton, NSW.

France

- French Army – École de l'infanterie, at Montpellier, France.

Indonesia

- Indonesian Army - Infantry Education Center (Pusat Pendidikan Infanteri abbreviated Pusdikif), at Bandung, West Java
- Indonesian Marine Corps - Marines Infantry Education Center (Pusat Pendidikan Infanteri Marinir abbreviated Pusdikifmar)

South Africa

- South African Army – South African Infantry School, at Oudtshoorn, Western Cape.

Sri Lanka

- Sri Lanka Army – Infantry Training Centre, at Minneriya.

Turkey

- Turkish Army – Tuzla Piyade Okulu, at Tuzla, Istanbul.

United Kingdom

- British Army – Infantry Training Centre at Catterick; Infantry Battle School, at Brecon, Wales; the former School of Infantry, Warminster
- Royal Marines – Commando Training Centre Royal Marines, Lympstone, Devon

United States

- United States Army – United States Army Infantry School at Fort Benning, Georgia.
- United States Marine Corps –
  - The Basic School (TBS) at Marine Corps Base Quantico, Virginia – (Mission: "Train and educate newly commissioned or appointed officers in the ... warfighting skills required of a rifle platoon commander" and conducts initial infantry MOS qualification training for Marine infantry officers.)
  - Infantry Officer Course (IOC) also at Marine Corps Base Quantico, Virginia – More advanced infantry training for those newly commissioned officers who are selected to become infantry officers
  - School of Infantry (SOI) – (Conducts post-Recruit Training for enlisted Marines in basic infantry and combat skills to ensure that "Every Marine is, first and foremost, a Rifleman" and conducts initial infantry MOS qualification training for infantry Marines.)
    - SOI(East) at Camp Lejeune, North Carolina.
    - SOI(West) at Camp Pendleton, California.

== See also ==
- Individual Movement/Minor Techniques
- Recruit training
- Military academy
- Military Occupational Specialty (MOS) – US Army and USMC job classification
