= Phil Pretorius =

South African Army general and museum director

Philip Pretorius
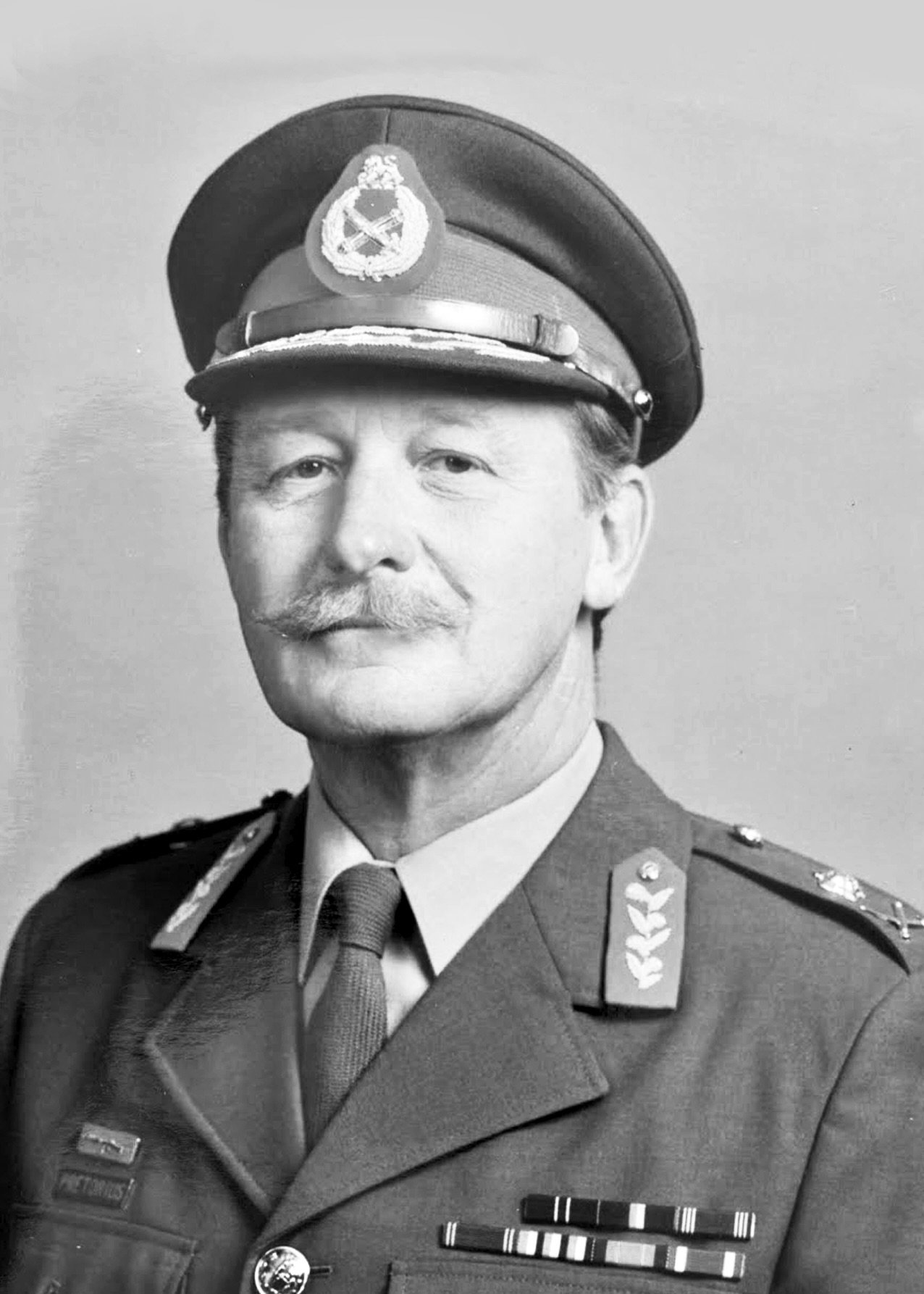
- Major General Philip Pretorius
- Born: 1930; Transvaal, Union of South Africa
- Died: 2021 (aged 90–91)
- Relatives: Andries Pretorius (double cousin); Paul Kruger (cousin)
- Military career
- Allegiance: South Africa; South Africa
- Branch: South African Army
- Service years: c.1950–1990
- Rank: Major General
- Unit: South African Artillery
- Commands: Northern Transvaal Command; Transkei Defence Force
- Conflicts: South African Border War
- Awards: Order of the Star of South Africa (Commander)
- Other work: Director, South African National Museum of Military History

Major General Philip Pretorius CSSA SD SM MMM (1930–2021) was a South African Army officer, artillery commander, military attaché, and museum director. Over a distinguished career he rose to the rank of major general and became one of South Africa’s most respected figures in military heritage and veterans’ affairs. He served as Military Attaché in Paris, Commanding Officer of the Northern Transvaal Command, head of the Transkei Defence Force, Director of the South African National Museum of Military History, and National President of the Gunners’ Association of South Africa from 1988 to 2011. In 1998 he received the Order of the Star of South Africa (Commander) from President Nelson Mandela for distinguished service to the Republic.

== Ancestry and family background ==
Philip Pretorius was born in 1930 in the Transvaal into an old Afrikaner family with deep frontier and military roots. His father served with the British Army during the First World War – as a South African volunteer – while his grandfather fought in the Second Boer War, was captured and imprisoned by British troops, and had relatives held in concentration camps. Descended from early settler lines, Pretorius was a double cousin of Andries Pretorius and a cousin of Paul Kruger, two of the most iconic figures of Boer nationalism. Through his Cape lineage he traced ancestry to Eva Krotoa, a Khoikhoi woman regarded as one of the earliest recorded figures at the Cape.

== Early life and education ==
Pretorius was educated at Parktown Boys' High School in Johannesburg, and University of the Witwatersrand (Wits) He later completed advanced military studies at the United States Army John F. Kennedy Special Warfare Center and School at Fort Bragg, North Carolina, where he graduated top of his class in intelligence and psychological warfare.

== Military career ==
Pretorius joined the South African Defence Force (SADF) during the early years of apartheid and rose through the ranks as a field intelligence and psychological operations officer. He saw active service in South West Africa (Namibia) and Angola during the Border War (1966–1989), participating in operations related to counter-insurgency and regional security.

From the 1970s he served as Commanding Officer of the Northern Transvaal Command, one of the key regional commands of the South African Army, headquartered in Pretoria.

He represented South Africa abroad as Military Attaché in Paris, liaising with NATO-aligned defence establishments and serving as a key point of contact for South African military relations in Europe.

He subsequently worked with the Transkei authorities on the organisation and leadership of the Transkei Defence Force. Contemporary accounts and vexillological records note his role as senior SADF secondee and military adviser to the Transkei forces.

Pretorius was widely recognised for his expertise in psychological warfare and strategic communication, fields in which he lectured to officers across the SADF and allied services; his leadership in this area is discussed in scholarly literature.

== Later career and museum leadership ==
After retiring from active service, Pretorius became Director of the South African National Museum of Military History in Johannesburg.

He later held senior roles within what became the Ditsong Museums of South Africa, the national museum network formed in 1999 through the amalgamation of the Transvaal Museum, the National Cultural History Museum, and the South African National Museum of Military History (initially the Northern Flagship Institution, renamed Ditsong in 2010).

== Awards and honours ==
In 1998, Pretorius was awarded the Order of the Star of South Africa (Military Division, Commander). Multiple official commemorative publications list his post-nominals as CSSA, SD, SM, MMM. He also received the Southern Cross Medal (SM) and the State President’s Decoration (SD).

== Roles in veterans’ affairs ==
Pretorius served as National President of the Gunners’ Association of South Africa from 1988 to 2011, later Honorary Life President.

== Personal life ==
Pretorius married Barbara Martin in 1954; the couple had three children: Karen, Philip and Inge.

== Legacy ==
Remembered for connecting South Africa's military and academic worlds, Pretorius preserved its martial heritage while guiding historical institutions throughout decades. His role at the Military History Museum and within the Ditsong system contributed to public understanding of the country’s complex military past.

== See also ==
- South African Defence Force
- South African Army Artillery Formation
- South African National Museum of Military History
- Northern Transvaal Command
- Parktown Boys' High School
