= I South African Corps =

1 South African Corps
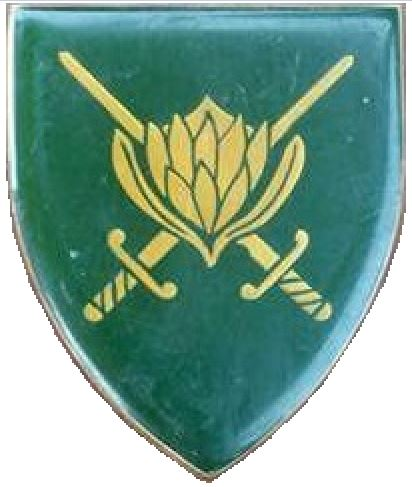
- SADF 1 South African Corps emblem
- Active: 1965–1985
- Country: South Africa
- Branch: South African Army
- Type: Infantry and Armour
- Size: Corps

1 South African Corps was a large military formation composed of two SADF Divisions.

== History ==
=== Requirement to consolidate leadership of the Citizen Force ===
An Active Citizen Force headquarters was established in April 1965. This Active Citizen Force headquarters changed its name to HQ Army Task Force (Permanent Force) in 1967. This Task Force managed 1 South African Corps which then was subdivided into 7th South African Infantry Division and 8th South African Armoured Division.

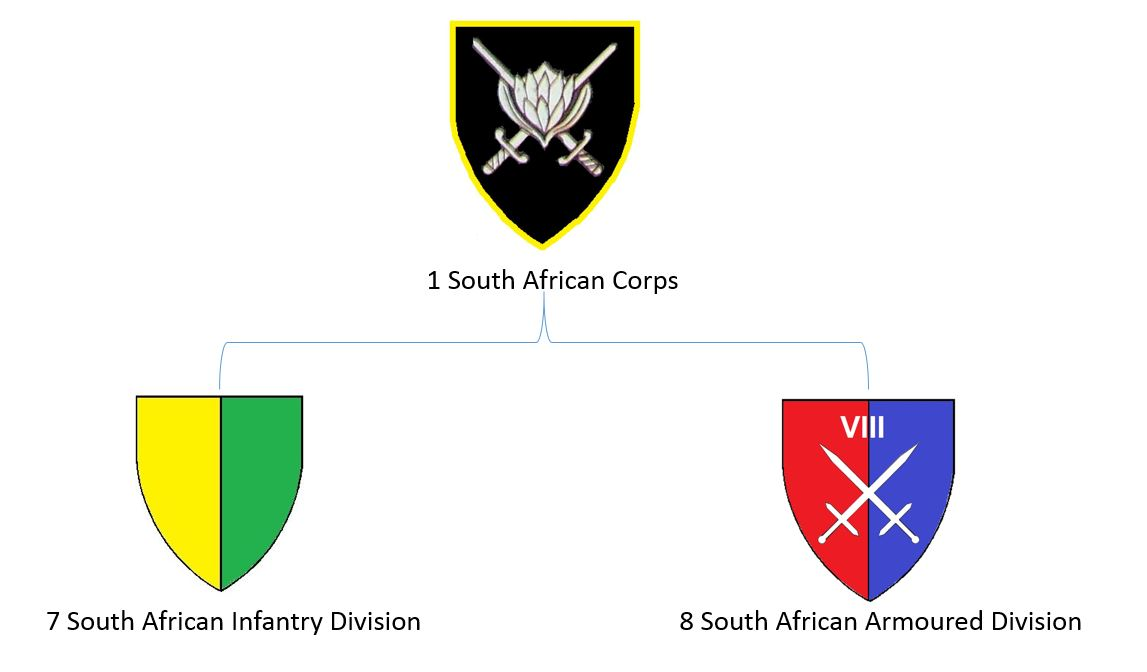
SADF 1 SA Corps structure

=== Breakdown late 70s ===
A provisional 1977 order of battle had 1 South African Corps organised as follows:

- Artillery
  - Field Artillery
    - 14 Light Regiment,
    - 15 Missile Regiment,
  - Light Anti-aircraft
    - 47 Anti-aircraft Regiment,
    - 57 Anti-aircraft Regiment,
    - 67 Anti-aircraft C&R Unit,
- Engineers
    - 17 Field Squadron,
    - 27 Engineer Support Regiment,
- Infantry
  - 1 Para,
  - 1 Para,
- Signals
  - Corps Signals Group
- Maintenance
  - 13 Maintenance Unit
  - 23 Maintenance Unit
  - 33 Maintenance Unit
  - 15 Transit Maintenance Unit
  - 201 Air Supply Company
  - 27 Field Workshop,
  - 37 Field Workshop,
  - 11 Medium Workshop,
  - 12 Medium Workshop,
- Medical
  - 23 Mobile Hospital,
  - 48 Field Ambulance Unit,
  - 10 Medical Evacuation Unit,
  - 26 Field Hygiene Company,
- Military Police
  - 11 Provost Company,
  - 12 Provost Company,
- Paymaster
  - 17 Field Pay Unit

=== Closure ===
1 SA Corps was disbanded in the early to mid-1980s. The two Divisions were at that stage, well established and would report directly to HQ Army Task Force.
