= Thaba Tshwane =

Thaba Tshwane Voortrekkerhoogte (formerly) Roberts Heights (originally)
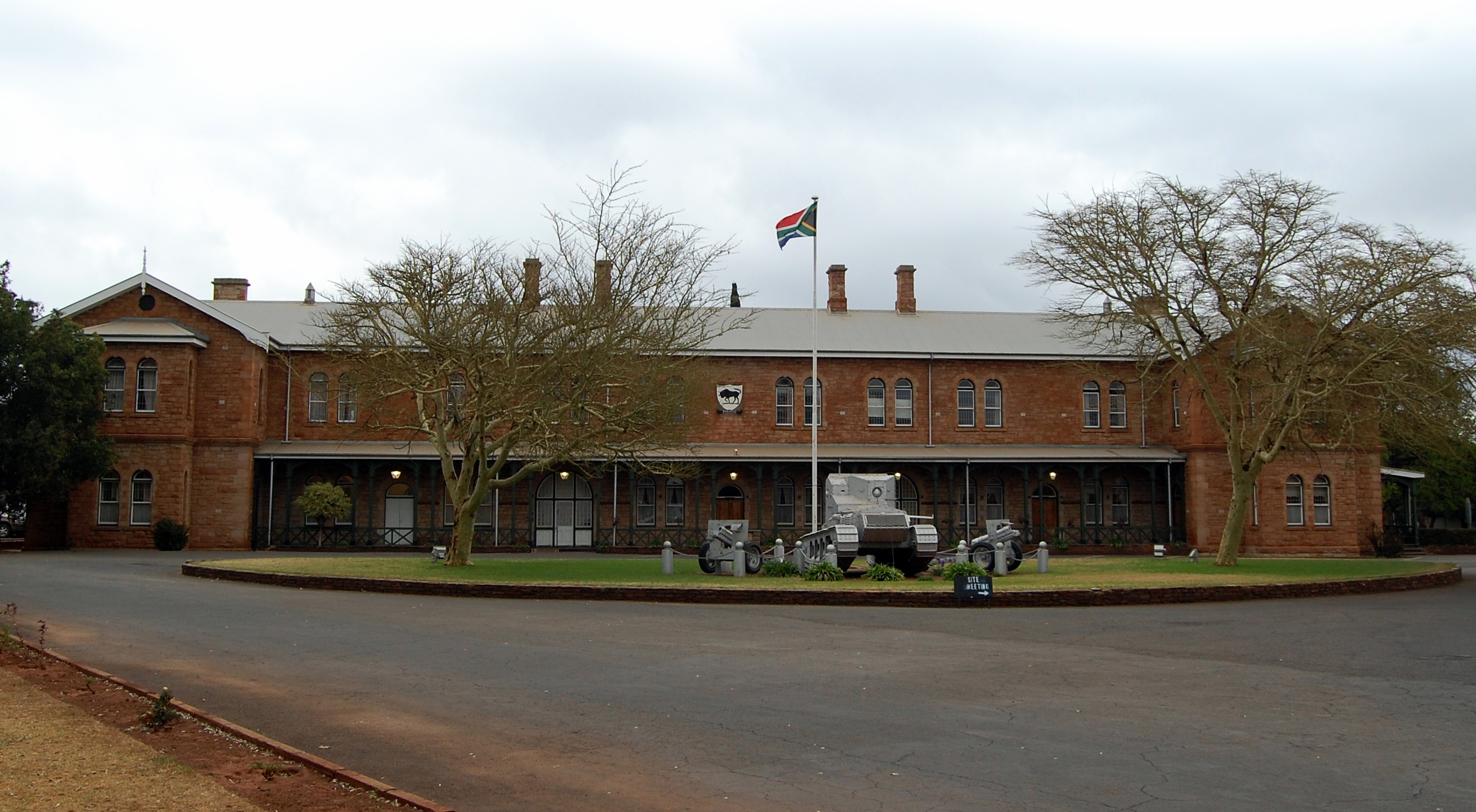
- SA Army College in Thaba Tshwane

- Location within Gauteng Location within South Africa
- Coordinates: 25.7901°S 28.1421°E
- Country: South Africa
- Province: Gauteng
- Municipality: City of Tshwane

Area
  - Total: 32.76 km^{2} (12.65 sq mi)

Population (2011)
  - Total: 6,727
  - Density: 205.3/km^{2} (531.8/sq mi)

Racial makeup (2011)
  - Black African: 68.5%
  - Coloured: 0.6%
  - Indian/Asian: 0.1%
  - White: 30.5%
  - Other: 0.4%

First languages (2011)
  - Northern Sotho: 29.1%
  - Afrikaans: 27.9%
  - S. Ndebele: 8.2%
  - Tsonga: 7.3%
  - Other: 27.5%
- Time zone: UTC+2 (SAST)
- Postal code (street): 0187
- PO box: 0143

Thaba Tshwane is a military base (or military area) in Pretoria, South Africa.

== Units and facilities ==
The oldest building in the complex is the South African Garrison Institute, what is now known as the Army College. Lord Kitchener laid the cornerstone on 12 June 1902.

Today the installation is home to:

- the South African Army College,
- the South African National Defence College under Rear-Admiral Laura Janse van Vuuren (),
- the National Ceremonial Guard and Band,
- the Military Police School,
- 1 Military Hospital,
- Bagaka Regiment,
- Ukhosi Parachute Engineer Regiment,
- Madzhakandila Anti-Aircraft Regiment,
- 1 Military Printing Regiment,
- Tshwane Regiment (Motorised Infantry),
- Steve Biko Artillery Regiment (Artillery Formation) and
- 4 Survey and Map Regiment.
- Army Support Base Garrison

== Names and history ==
Founded around 1905 by the British Army, and called Roberts Heights after Field Marshal Lord Roberts. The area was subsequently renamed Voortrekkerhoogte ("Voortrekker Heights") in 1939 by the government of the Union of South Africa, following the beginning of the building of the nearby Voortrekker Monument, at a time of growing Afrikaner nationalism. On 19 May 1998, following the end of apartheid, it was renamed again, as Thaba Tshwane.
