= Chief of Staff Finance =

Chief of Staff Finance is a senior position within the South African National Defence Force, responsible for all Financial aspects of the Defence Force.

The post was created in 1978 with Lieutenant General A J van Deventer as the Chief of Staff Finance
