= Tshwane Regiment =

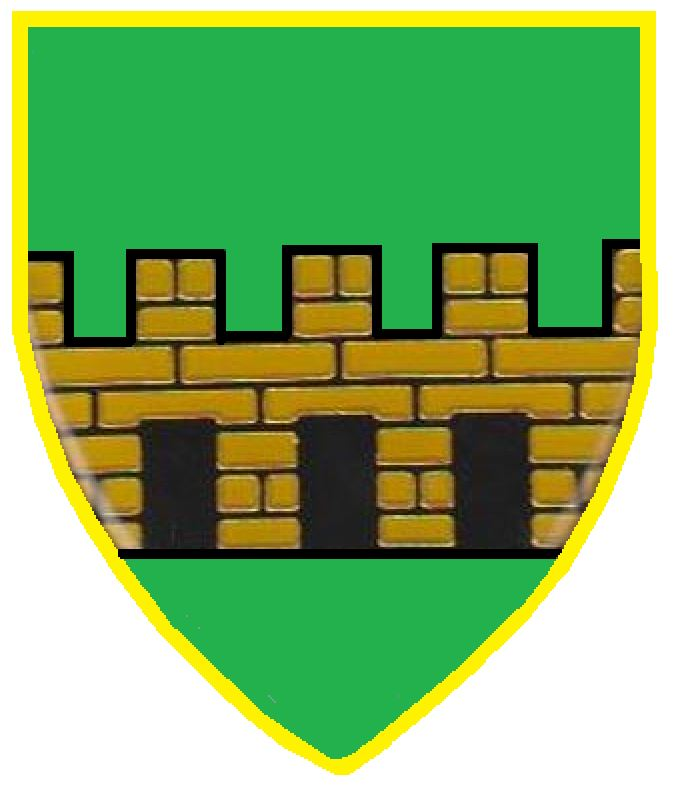
- SANDF Tshwane Regiment emblem
- Active: 2002 to present, but with history from affiliated commandos dating to 1969
- Country: South Africa
- Allegiance: Republic of South Africa
- Branch: South African Army
- Type: Infantry
- Role: Infantry
- Size: One battalion
- Part of: South African Infantry Formation; Army Conventional Reserve
- Garrison/HQ: Thaba Tshwane, Pretoria

Insignia
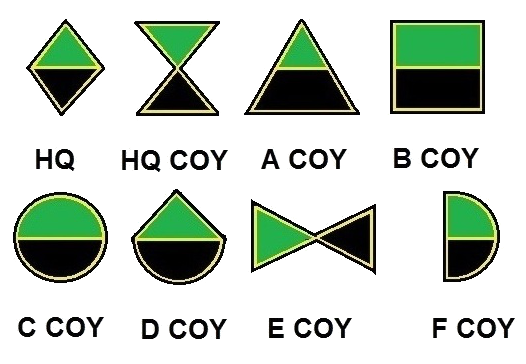
- Company level Insignia

- SA Motorised Infantry beret bar circa 1992: SA Motorised Infantry beret bar

Tshwane Regiment is an infantry regiment of the South African Army. As a reserve unit, it has a status roughly equivalent to that of a British Army Reserve or United States Army National Guard unit.

== History ==
This regiment was originally established as the Yskor Pretoria Commando in 1969 and over the years several commando units and regiments, such as Hillcrest, Munitoria, Regiment Pretorius and 2 Regiment Northern Transvaal were amalgamated with Regiment Schanskop.

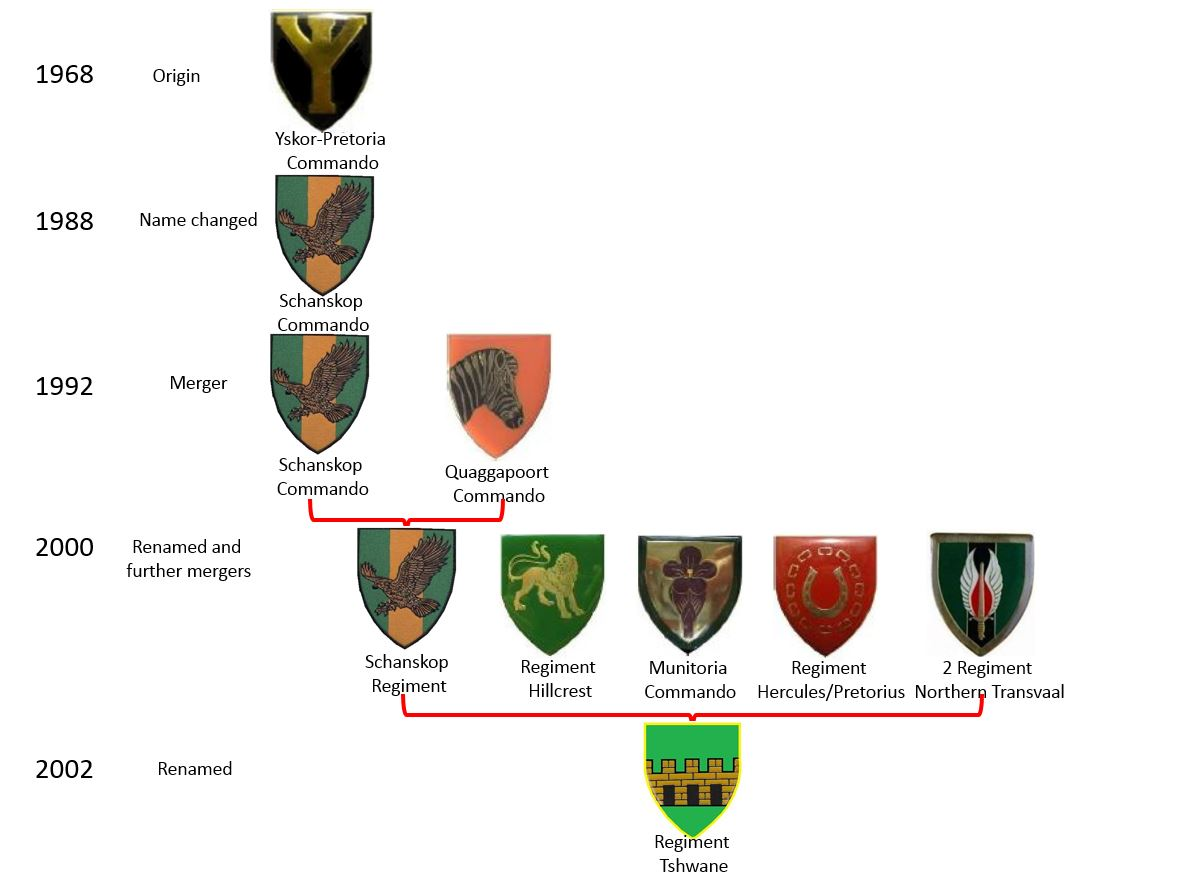
SANDF History of Tshwane Regiment

In December 2002, the name "Tshwane Regiment" was approved to be in line with the area where the regiment is situated.

=== Operations ===
Members of this regiment have been deployed internally and externally of South Africa. The regiment has been deployed in the Soutpansberg Military Area and during elections.

== Leadership ==
Leadership
| From | Honorary Colonel | To | Ribbon |
|---|---|---|---|
| | No known incumbents | | |
| From | Lt Col S Breytenbach | To | Ribbon |
| | No known incumbents | | |
| From | Regimental Sergeants Major | To | Ribbon |
| | No known incumbents | | |

=== Current Dress Insignia ===
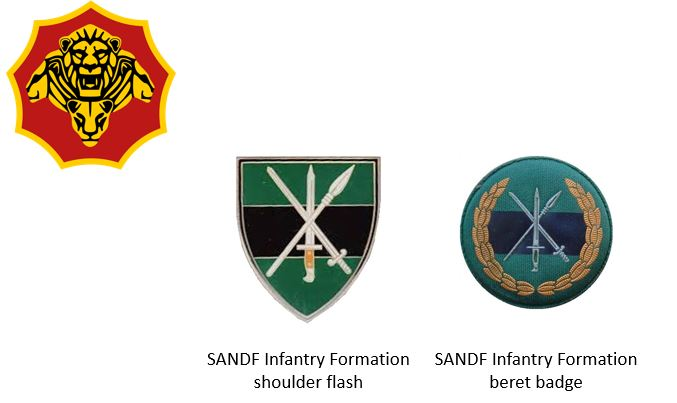
SANDF era Infantry Formation insignia
