= 912 Battalion (SWATF) =

Regiment Erongo
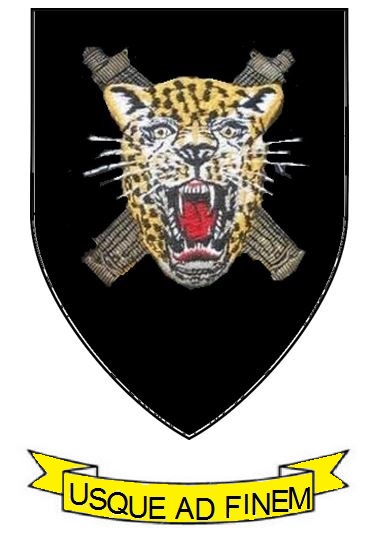
- SWATF 912 Battalion emblem
- Active: 1980
- Disbanded: 1990–91
- Country: Namibia, South Africa
- Allegiance: South Africa
- Branch: South African Army,
- Type: Motorised Infantry
- Part of: South West African Territorial Force
- Motto: Usque Ad Finem “To the very end”
- Equipment: Casspir

Insignia
- Part of the South West African Territorial Force

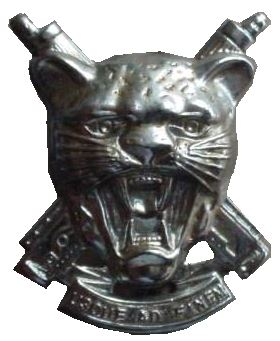
- SWATF Regiment Erongo beret badge

Regiment Erongo was a quick-reaction unit of the South West African Territorial Force.

== History ==
Regiment Erongo was formed in January 1980 as 912 Battalion and part of 91 Brigade of the South West Africa Territory Force. 91 SWA Brigade was a Reaction Force with its base at Windhoek, in sector 40. It acted as a mobile reserve to support SWATF operations in Sectors 20 in northern Namibia and was modelled on the SADF motorised brigade.

912 Battalion was part of 91 Brigade

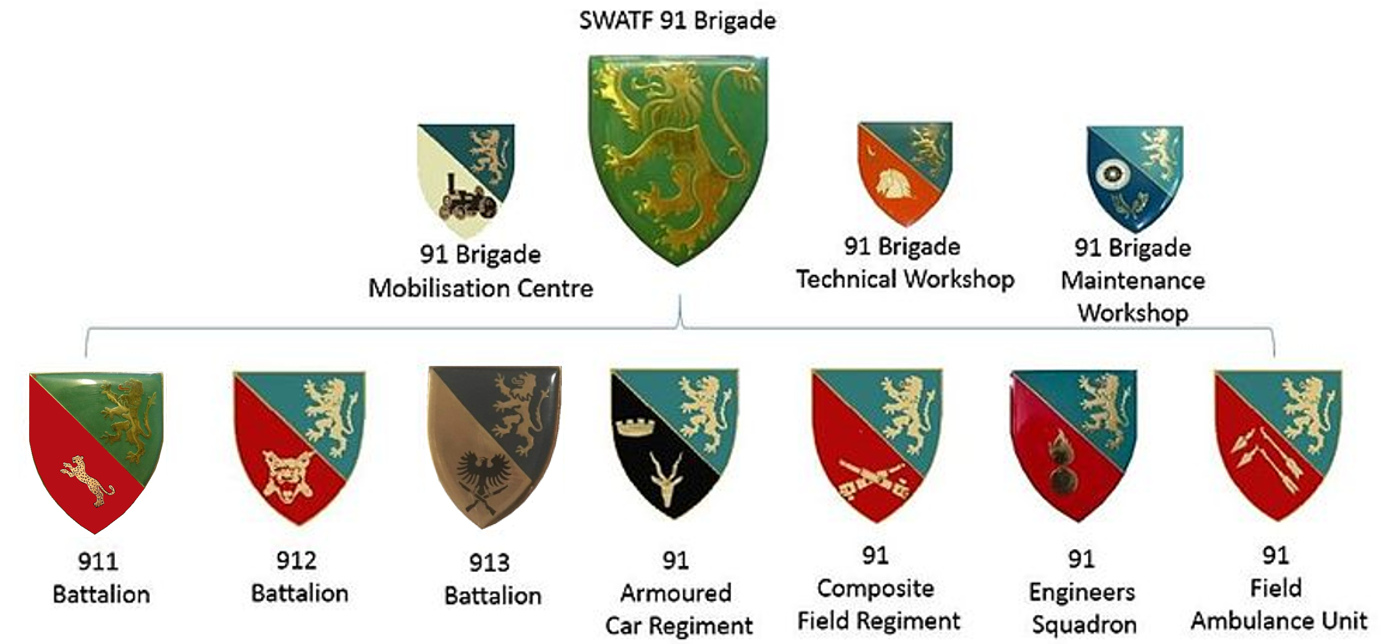

2 SWA Specialist Unit was formed in 1987 out of the parachute company of Regiment Erongo.

Regiment Erongo was disbanded upon the independence of Namibia in 1990-91.

== Roll of Honour ==
05 Mar 1980: 72208721BT Rifleman Johannes Jacobus Maass from Regiment Erongo (912 Bn) was Killed in Action during a contact with PLAN insurgents in Northern Owamboland. He was 24.

23 Mar 1980: 71260731BT Corporal Renier Stephanus van Zyl from Regiment Erongo (912 Bn) SWATF was Killed in Action during a contact with SWAPO/PLAN insurgents in Northern Owamboland. He was 24.

== See also ==
- Namibian War of Independence
- South African Border War
