= South West Africa Command =

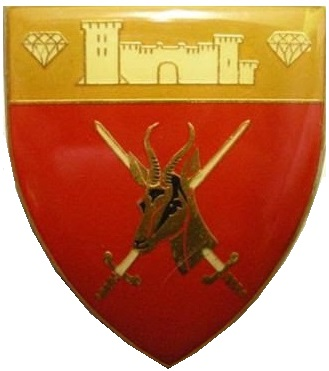
- Active: 1939–1988
- Country: South Africa
- Type: Command
- Headquarters: Windhoek

Insignia
- South West Africa Command Bar

South West Africa Command was a command of the South African Army.

== History ==
=== Origin ===
South West Africa Command was one of the South African Defence Force's regional commands, which made up the Territorial Force.

Based in Windhoek, it was initially responsible for the security of the entire South West Africa, forming the main level of command for military operations providing logistic, administrative and service support to all units and formations operating in its area of responsibility as well as support for the Police.

South West Africa Command was established in 1939 under a Union Government Proclamation, No 234 of 1939. At that stage it consisted of a citizen force component with a support company and signals.

=== Establishment of local Infantry ===
By December 1939, the Commands first unit, 1 SWA Infantry Battalion was established.

=== Establishment of a local commando system ===
By 1940, 32 defence rifle clubs were also established but were upgraded by 1948 to rifle commandos.

In 1957 the Infantry Battalion was converted to an armored car regiment and the rifle commandos were upgraded to full commandos.

=== Formation of the SWATF ===
With the formation of the South West Africa Territorial Force in 1977, South West Africa Command's area of responsibility was diminished by 1980 to the frontline sectors of the territory.

=== SADF Frontline Sectors Control ===
By the 1990s, South West Africa Command controlled Sectors 10, 20 and 70. All local SWATF forces in these sectors also fell directly under SWA Command.

==== SADF units in Sector 10 ====
- SADF's Air Force Base Ondangwa,
- SADF's 5 Maintenance Unit at Ondangwa,
- SADF's Sector 10 Training Unit at Oshivelo,
- SADF's Sector 10 Signals Unit at Oshikati,
- SADF's Sector 10 Maintenance Unit at Oshikati,
- SADF's Sector 10 Provost Unit at Oshikati,
- SADF's 25 Engineering Squadron at Oshakati, and
- SADF's 61 Mechanised Battalion Group at Omuthiya (although not SWATF, 61 Mech had its origins in South West Africa)

==== SADF units in Sector 20 ====
- SADF's Air Force Base Rundu and
- SADF's 6 Maintenance Unit at Rundu.

==== SADF units in Sector 70 ====
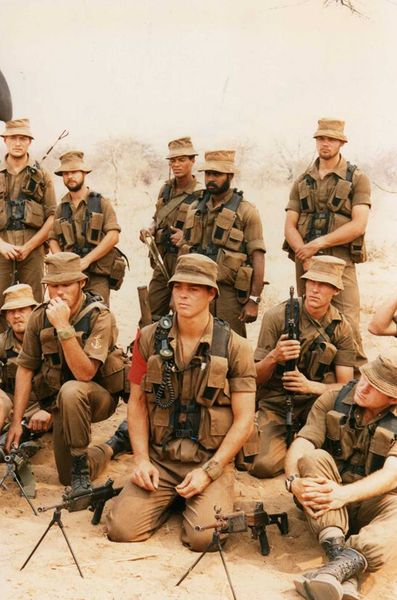
South African Marines receiving a briefing in Namibia on Angolan / Zambian border.

- SADF's Air Force Base at Mpacha,
- SADF's Navy Marine Company utilized for river patrols, and
- SADF's 9 Maintenance Unit at Mpacha.

==== Modular Battalions ====
Modular Battalions main function was internal operations. Sub units were attached according to the requirements of a specific situation, i.e. the "modular nature".

These units were made up from temporary elements (or ‘modules’) from a variety of units and would be deployed in company patrol bases along the border. 53 Battalion for example would have companies from 1 SAI, the Cape Town Highlanders, Rand Light Infantry and 6 SAI allocated to it for a particular season, while 54 Battalion would source its infantry elements from 8 SAI and the SACC.

There was usually a company of SWATF attached to each Modular Battalion on rotation to provide ‘local knowledge’ and various elements of 1 SWA Specialist Unit were also attached to provide tracking and patrolling expertise. Koevoet or Romeo-Mike teams were also frequently stationed in these company bases for mutual protection, but would generally operate independently.

The Modular Battalions’ heavy weapons often included a wide variety of captured Soviet and obsolete British World War II-era items, which were usually static, being primarily intended for base defence. Motor transport was limited, with a few Buffels being retained for patrolling and SAAF helicopters often being utilised for inter-base liaison. The companies of a Modular Battalion were generally weak during the quiet dry season (maybe 30- 50% strength), but would each be brought up to the full strength of five platoons in time for the wet season, which was when the bush would become jungle and SWAPO-PLAN infiltration teams would stream southwards. Their main responsibility was to secure their assigned area in which they conducted cordon and search operations, patrols, checkpoints, mine sweeping and the protection of roads and water systems.

- Five ‘Modular’ Infantry Battalions
  - 51 Battalion at Ruacana,
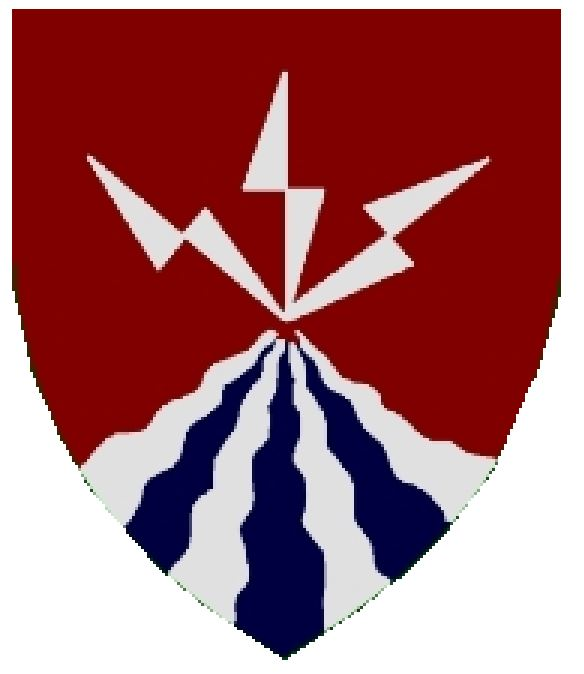
    51 Battalion
  - 52 Battalion at Ogongo,
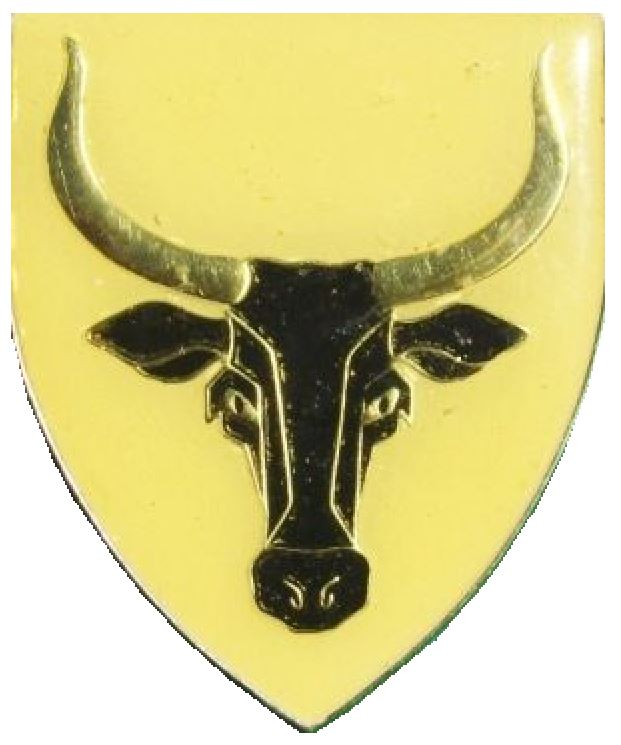
    52 Battalion emblem
  - 53 Battalion at Ondangwa,
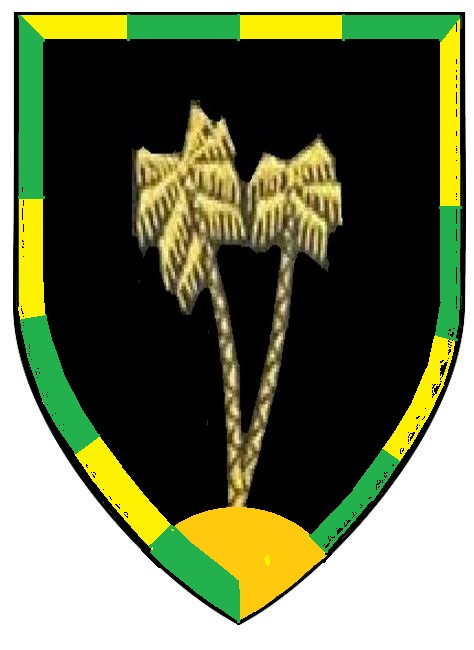
    53 Battalion emblem
  - 54 Battalion at Eenhana
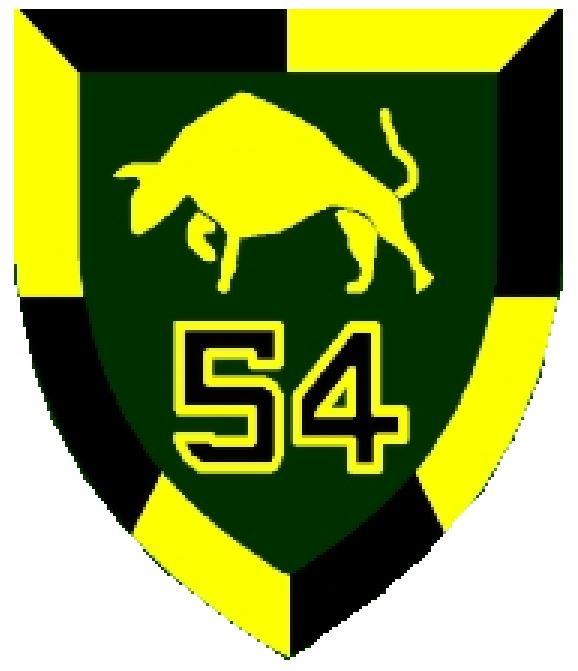
    54 Battalion
    and
  - 55 Battalion at Nepara.
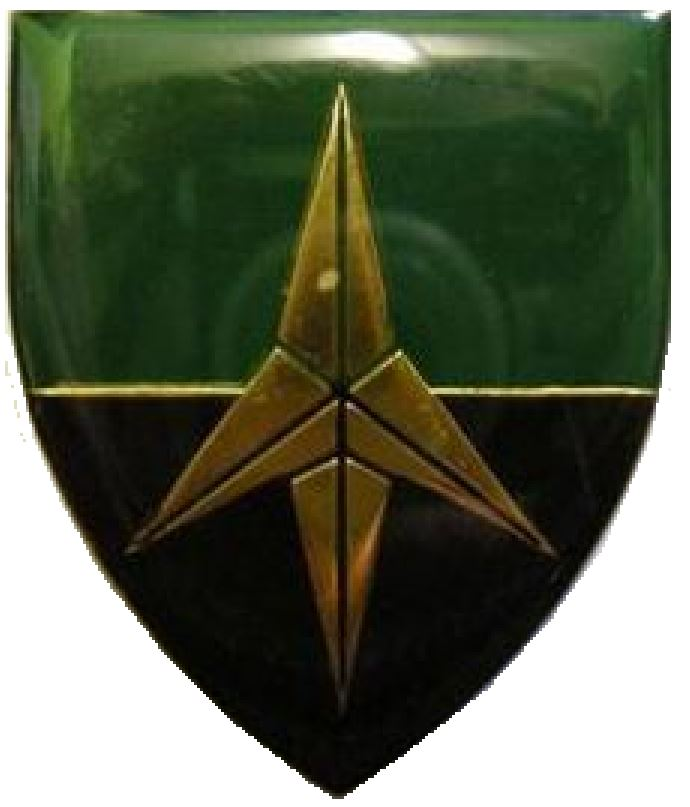
    55 Battalion

=== Insignia of South West Africa Command 1980s ===
==== SWA Command Headquarters insignia ====
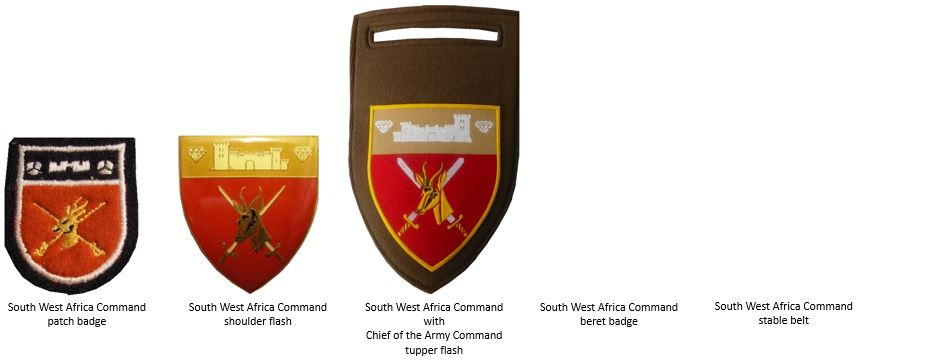
South West Africa Command insignia

==== SWA Command Units insignia ====
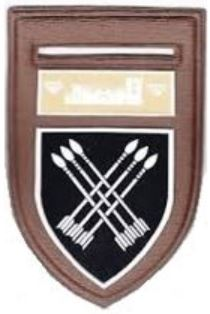
32 Battalion with South West Africa Command

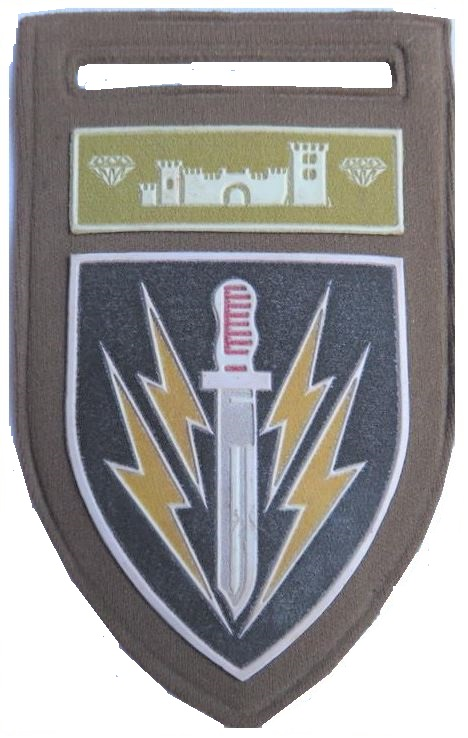
61 Mech with South West Africa Command

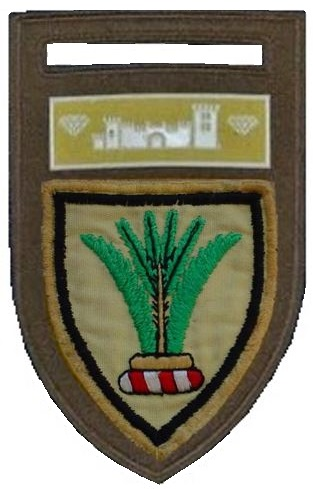
Sector 10 Headquarters with South West Africa Command

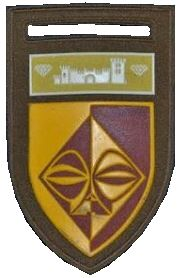
Sector 20 Headquarters with South West Africa Command

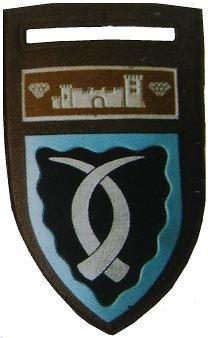
Sector 70 Headquarters with South West Africa Command

==== SWA Command Sector Units insignia ====
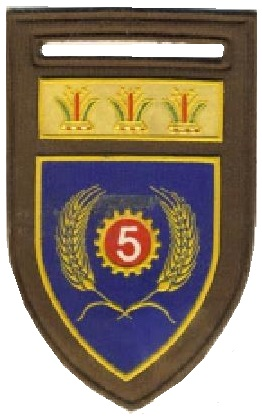
Sector 10 5 maintenance unit at Ondangwa with South West Africa Command

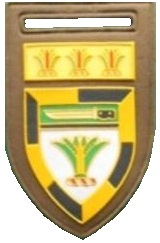
Sector 10 Training Unit at Oshivello with South West Africa Command

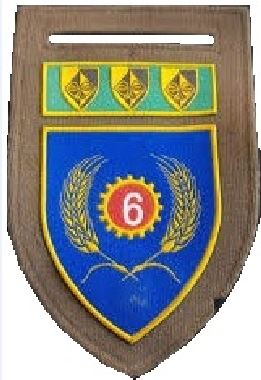
Sector 20 6 Maintenance unit at Rundu with South West Africa Command

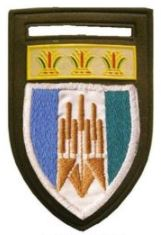
SWATF 101 Battalion in Sector 10

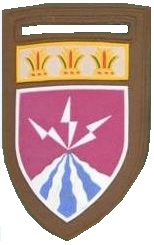
51 Modular Battalion in Sector 10

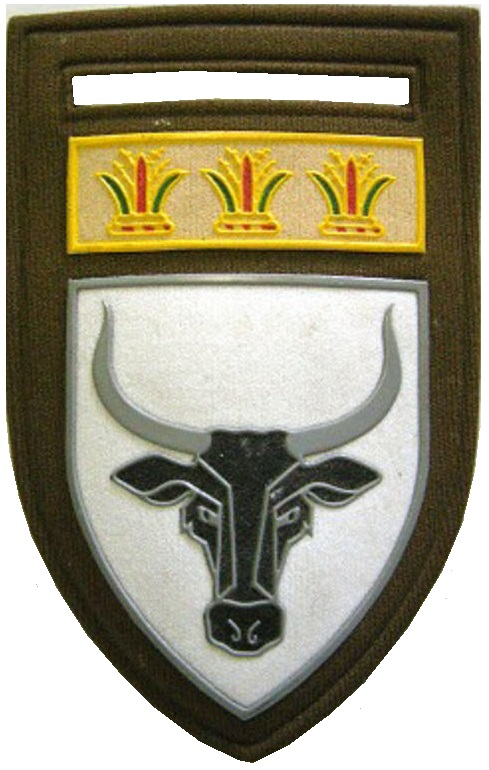
52 Modular Battalion in Sector 10

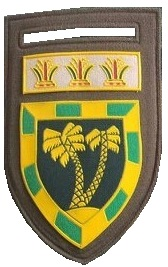
53 Modular Battalion in Sector 10

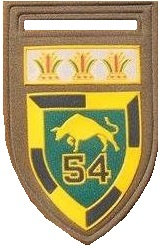
54 Modular Battalion in Sector 10

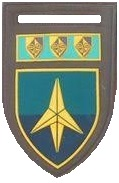
55 Modular Battalion in Sector 20

== Leadership ==
- 1966 Colonel Magnus Malan
- 1979 Colonel Johannes Geldenhuys
