= 36 Battalion (SWATF) =

36 Battalion/203 Battalion
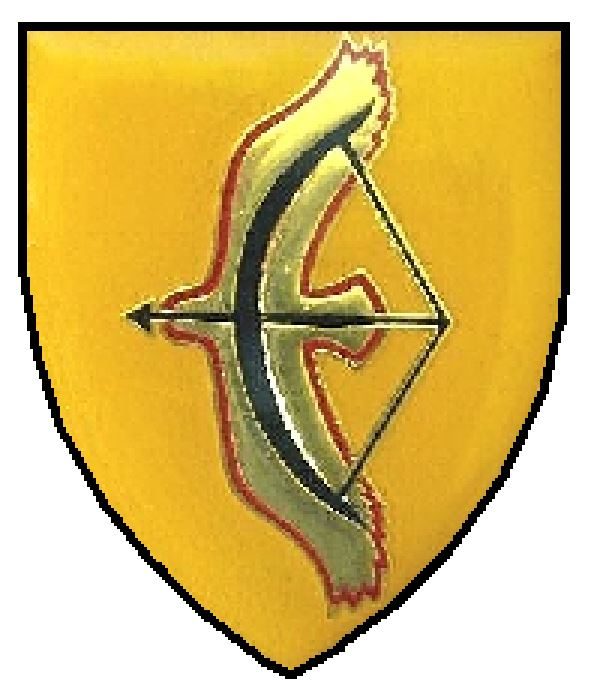
- SWATF 36 Battalion emblem
- Country: Namibia, South Africa
- Allegiance: South Africa
- Branch: South African Army,
- Type: Light Infantry
- Part of: South African Defence Force, later South West African Territorial Force
- Garrison/HQ: Luhebu-North Boesmanland
- Nicknames: TI # NHU” (find and destroy)

Insignia
- Part of the South West African Territorial Force

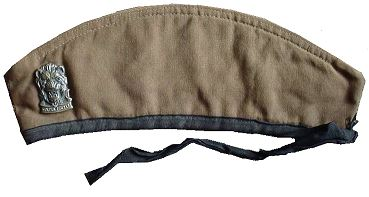
- SWATF Reaction Force bonnie cap

36 Battalion was a light infantry battalion in the South African Army and in later years became part of the SWATF.

== History ==
In May 1978, a group of Omega San soldiers were sent to Bushmanland to form a combat unit originally known as 36 Battalion. The Battalions's soldiers was made up of two subgroups:

- the !Xun from Angola and
- the Dzuwazi (Zu/’hoasi), a subgroup of the !Kung from Bushmanland and the neighbouring north-western corner of Botswana.

Initially, 36 Battalion was commanded by a Capt. G.J. Coetzee and had X2 Battalion Headquarters A: Command & Operations HQ at Tshumkwe. B: Admin / Logistics / Training & Recruitment at Lehebu North.

=== Renaming ===
The South West Africa Territory Force SWATF renumbered battalion numbers according to their geographical positioning on the border. The prefix 10 pertained to battalions operation to the west of the Kavango River, 20 to the Kavango or central region and 70 to the eastern region. Under this system, 36 Battalion was renamed 203 Battalion 1982.

In 1981, 36 Battalion CONSOLLIDATED headquarters moved to LUHEBU SOUTH and in 1982 LEHEBU SOUTH was renamed MANGETTI Dune by Commandant Buitendag. From 1982, 203 Battalion formed part of the reaction force of SWATF, as a tracking battalion.

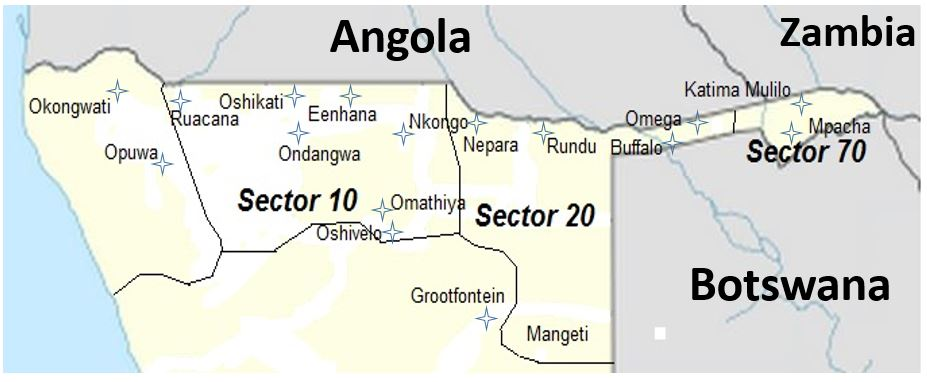
SWATF Northern Sector Map

=== Commanding Officers ===
. 1978 Capt. Major 1979-1980 / Commandant 1981

- 1982-1983 Commandant Buitendag. In the same year the unit’s badge was designed with the motto “TI # NHU” (find and destroy).
- 1984, Commandant J.D.C. Jankowitz. A mounted unit was formed in 1985 as well as a mounted training centre at M’kata.
- 1987, Commandant J.L. Pattison. During this time Bravo Company was involved in late part of Operations Packer and Displace in 1988.
- Dec 1988, Lt. Col. Scholtz Van Wyk assumed command of 203 Battalion and was responsible for the relocation of the unit to South Africa, as well the eventual demobilising of the unit for the preparation of Namibian independence.

=== Withdrawal of 36-203 Battalion to South Africa ===
The Battalion reverted to 32 Battalion name in 1989 when it transferred back to the SADF. UN Resolution 435 called on South Africa to reduce its forces in Namibia to 12,000 before the start of any peace process and finally to 1500 by 1989. Several thousand San, fearing reprisal or intimidation, left for South Africa with the SADF.

The soldiers of 36-203 Battalion and their families were settled near Schmidtsdrif in the Northern Cape.

=== Disbandment ===
By 1993, 32 Battalion was disbanded at a public ceremony in the Cape Province. Soldiers were transferred to other units in the Northern Cape and would help patrol the Namibian border.

== Structure ==
By the 1980s, 36 Battalion consisted of:

- a HQ,
- a Support Company,
- a Maintenance Section,
- Alpha Company
- Bravo Company of 3 Platoons each, 6 teams, 25 - 30 men, 3 Buffel vehicles and a
- Reconnaissance Wing with 6 Tracker Groups of 5 or 6 men.

== Roll of Honour ==
- Ntamshe, Kumsa
