= 913 Battalion (SWATF) =

Regiment Namutoni/913 Battalion
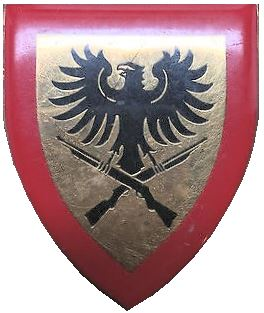
- SWATF 913 Battalion/Regiment Namuntoni emblem
- Active: 1980
- Country: Namibia, South Africa
- Allegiance: South Africa
- Branch: South African Army,
- Type: Infantry
- Part of: South West African Territorial Force
- Garrison/HQ: Namutoni
- Equipment: Casspir, Buffel

Insignia
- Part of the South West African Territorial Force

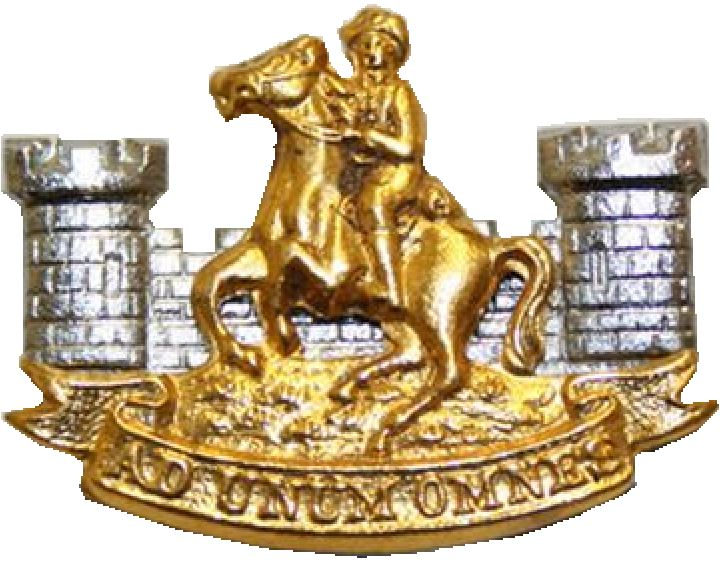
- Cap badge

913 Battalion was part of 91 South West African Brigade.

== History ==
This unit was formed in 1980 at Namutoni situated 114 km kilometers northwest of Tsumeb. 91 SWA Brigade was the Reaction Force with its base in Windhoek in Sector 40. It acted as a mobile reserve to support SWATF operations in sectors 10 and in northern Namibia and was modeled on SADF motorised brigade.

913 Battalion was part 91 Brigade

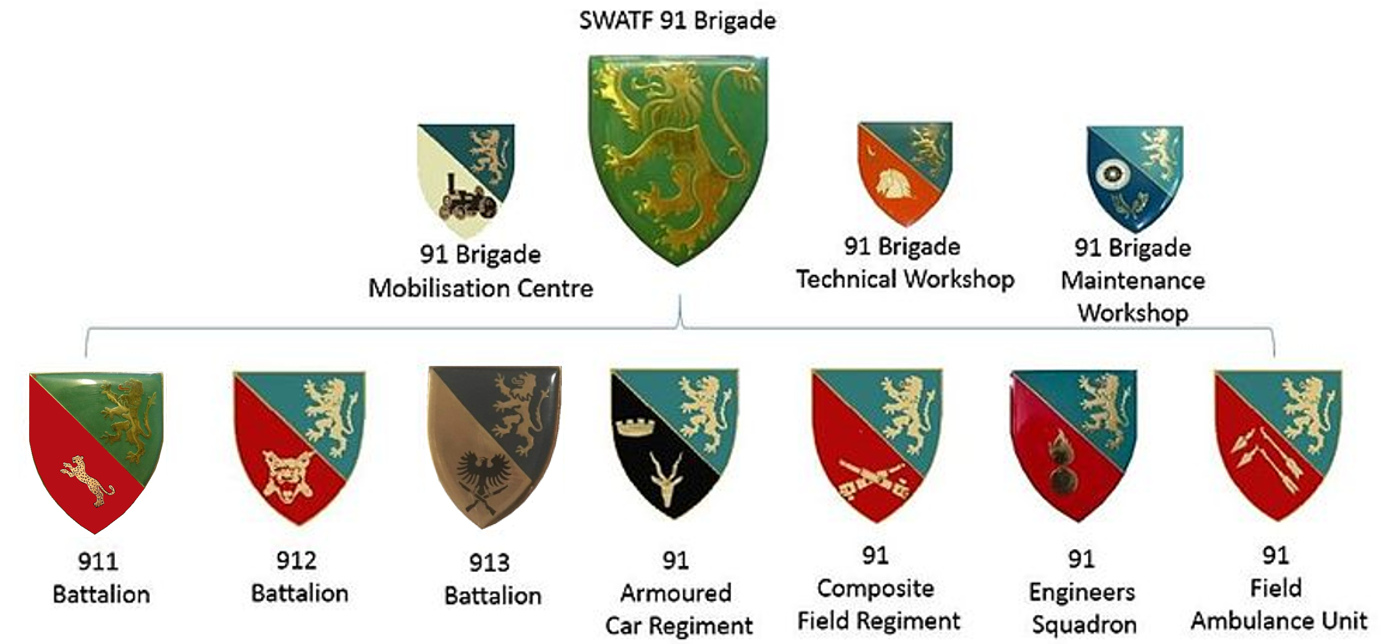

== Operational area ==
The Battalions main operational area was Owamboland.

== Roll of Honour ==
- 23 Mar 1980: 71260731BT Corporal Renier Stephanus van Zyl from Regiment Namutoni SWATF was Killed in Action during a contact with PLAN insurgents in Northern Owamboland. He was 24.

== See also ==
- Namibian War of Independence
- South African Border War
