= 1 SWA Specialist Unit =

Former South African Army unit

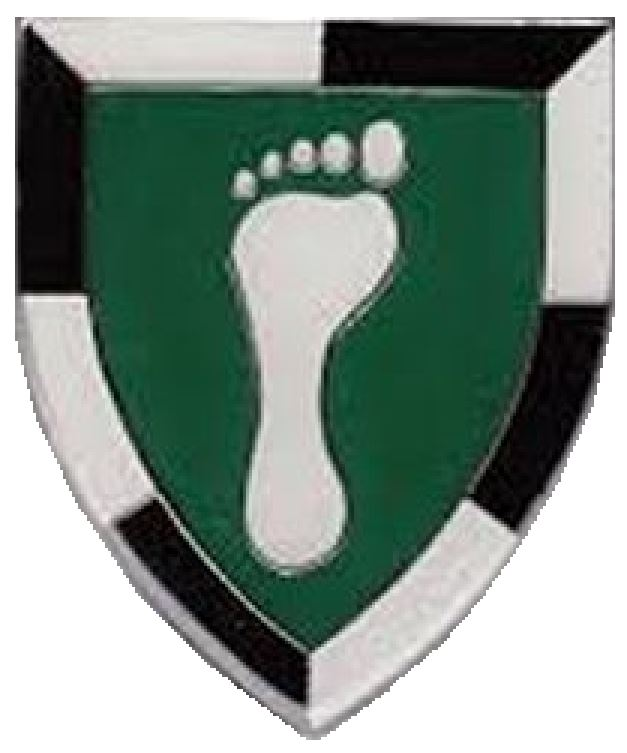
- SWATF 1 Spes emblem
- Active: 1977
- Country: Namibia, South Africa
- Allegiance: South Africa
- Branch: South African Army,
- Type: Infantry
- Part of: South West African Territorial Force
- Garrison/HQ: Oshivelo
- Equipment: Casspir, Buffel, Honda XR 500

Commanders
- Current commander: Major David Mentz

Insignia
- Part of the South West African Territorial Force

1 South West African Specialist Unit, also known as 1 SWASpes, was part of the South West African Territorial Force.

== History ==
The South West African Territorial Force Command identified an urgent need for horse mounted and motorbike mounted units and dogs for the operational areas.

The conclusions reached was for a unit organisation such as 202 Battalion to be adjusted so as to accommodate horse and dog units for operational use, and specifically, the urgent need for the acquisition of two platoons of mounted infantry. This included the furnishing of horses and equine related equipment, as well as the training and appointing of a qualified platoon commanding officer, full-time veterinarian and farriers.

The Equestrian Centre became involved in the first purpose-built frontline horse and motorcycle mounted infantry base in the Operational Area.

By 1978, 1 SWASpes had diversified into the application of motorcycles, trackers and later the introduction of tracking and explosives detection dogs. 1 SWASpes was among the first to combine conventional infantry forces on the ground with the skills of trackers, the abilities of dogs and the quick reaction abilities afforded by horses and motorcycle units.

Equestrian platoons were detached to bases across the Operational Area, though the main equestrian unit in South West Africa was stationed at Oshivelo.

1 SWASpes introduced to counter insurgency, the application of the Packhound; using dogs to track, run down, and corner quarry for infantry or mounted soldiers to interdict. These packs could keep a speed of 15 km for over four hours, peaking at 30 km for 15 minutes.

== Organization ==
By 1978, it comprised two companies of mounted infantry, two platoons of trackers and two platoons of motorcyclists, and a force of 60 dogs.

== Demobilisation ==
1 SWASpes was demobilised in 1989 during the negotiation and transition phase of Namibian independence. Prominent serving officers at the time of demobilisation included the last commanding officer, Major David Mentz, and Lieutenant David Durrheim, who was the last medical officer of 1 SWASpes.

== See also ==
- Namibian War of Independence
- South African Border War
