= 301 Battalion =

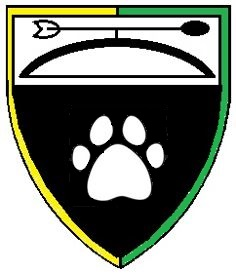
- SWATF 301 Battalion emblem
- Active: 1984
- Country: Namibia, South Africa
- Allegiance: South Africa
- Branch: South African Army,
- Type: Infantry
- Part of: South West African Territorial Force
- Garrison/HQ: Tsintsabis, East of Etosha National Park, north of Tsumeb
- Equipment: Casspir, Buffel

Commanders
- Ceremonial chief: Captain Daan Liebenberg

Insignia
- Part of the South West African Territorial Force

301 Battalion was part of Sector 30 of the South West African Territorial Force.

== Leadership ==
South West Africa-Army-OR-4. The Corporal rank of the SWATF

Corporal (Korporaal). Stephanus Christiaan Grobler.

== History ==
=== 61 Mech Connection ===
This unit was first known as the Northern Border Company and was located at Tsintsabis, close to the Alpha Cutline. It was under command of 61 Mech Battalion Group before it was placed under command of Sector 30. Sector 30 was used for Operation Yahoo, Carrot and Hokaai.

The unit consisted of Bushmen trackers and at one stage SWATF Motorised Infantry Companies.

=== Cutlines ===
The units main task was to patrol Alpha, Bravo and Charlie Cutlines as well as area between these cutlines from Oshivello to Mururani Gate in sector 20. They also patrolled the Northern Border of the Etosha Game Reserve as a final buffer against PLAN Typhoon.

The units shoulder flash was never officially recognised.

=== Diversity ===
301 Battalion was known for its diverse Battalion. Some instructors and commanding officers being white, while most of the Soldiers per platoon were colored natives that switched sides from SWAPO or joined to protect their families from SWAPO attacks.

=== Major Role ===
301 Battalion played a major role in defending the borders of South West Africa (Namibia) as where they were stationed (Tsintsabis and Tsumeb) was a hot zone for attacks by SWAPO and PLAN, if they were to break through, it would give them a straight shot into civilian and military infrastructure, Tsintsabis and Tsumeb had 2 nicknames "The Death Triangle" and "The Road Of Death", they were given these nicknames because of how frequently SWAPO and PLAN would attack the road between Tsintsabis and Tsumeb via planting landmines in the road after burning holes into the tar and via launching night insurgency attacks where they would try to enter the country, 301 Battalion members had their heads on a swivel 24/7 to protect the border and they played a major role in ensuring the border of South West Africa's safety.It is also worth mentioning that 301 Battalion helped in protecting roughly 11,000-13,000 Namibian civilians from SWAPO and PLAN attacks as SWAPO would oftentimes attack civilians to spark uprising, to cause unrest, to send a message to the SADF and to send a message to SWATF.Although this tactic wasn't very effective as many SWATF members lost their families to these attacks, which would end up working against SWAPO and PLAN as it would cause many SWATF and Koevoet members to seek revenge and would even cause some SWAPO and PLAN members to switch sides and help the SWATF instead.

== See also ==
- Namibian War of Independence
- South African Border War
