= South West Africa Territorial Force =

Armed forces of South West Africa, 1977–1989

South West African Territorial Force
- Suidwes-Afrikaanse Gebiedsmag (Afrikaans)
- SWATF Insignia
- Active: 1977–1989
- Country: South West Africa
- Branch: South African Defence Force
- Size: 10,100 (1981); 22,000 (1987)
- Part of: Department of Defence for South West Africa
- Garrison/HQ: Windhoek, South West Africa

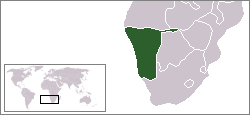
Namibia, with a long Atlantic coastline, borders Angola, Botswana, South Africa, Zambia and Zimbabwe

The South West Africa Territorial Force (SWATF) was an auxiliary arm of the South African Defence Force (SADF) and comprised the armed forces of South West Africa (now Namibia) from 1977 to 1989. It emerged as a product of South Africa's political control of the territory which was granted to the former as a League of Nations mandate following World War I.

== History and background ==
From 1966 until 1989, South African security forces waged a long and bitter counterinsurgency conflict against indigenous nationalists in what was then South West Africa, represented by the Marxist South West African People's Organisation (SWAPO) and its military wing, the People's Liberation Army of Namibia (PLAN). As the guerrilla war intensified, however, it became clear that the local civilian police alone were not enough to cope with SWAPO/PLAN incursions and escalating unrest. Consequently, military units were deployed for the first time; 60,000 South African combat troops were engaged in South West Africa by the late 1970s.

=== Establishment ===
As part of a general policy of military and social reform, Pretoria initiated the establishment of local defence and police agencies for its protectorate beginning in 1977.

=== Structure and activation ===
A start was also made with the regrouping of existing units into four formations:

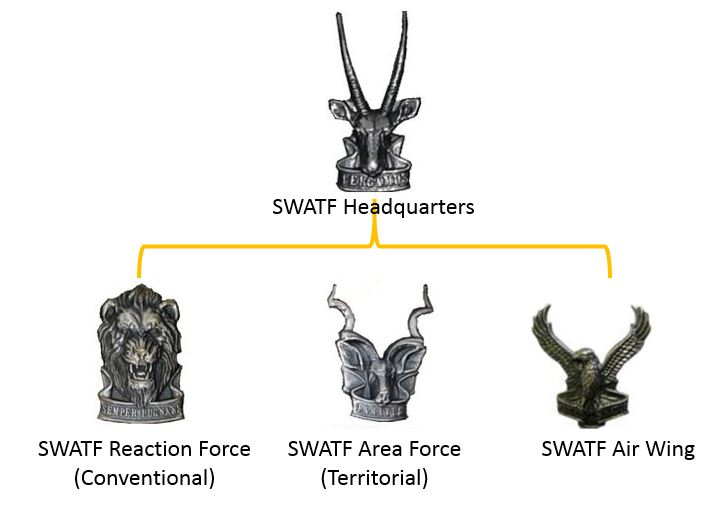
SWATF Structure overview

- a Formation Headquarters Staff,
- a Reaction Force (conventional),
- an Area Force (Territorial) and
- an Air Wing.

As regarding the latter, the South African Air Force would remain responsible for aerial operations although provision was made for an air commando squadron consisting of private and commercially qualified air crews. Their main function was to assist the South African Air Force in reconnaissance and communication flights and to provide operational officers for the operational service.

The new South West African Territorial Force was officially created on 1 August 1980, from South West African citizens already serving with the South African Defence Force.

Operationally, the SWATF was further divided into a Permanent Force infantry component, logistic/administrative divisions, a training wing, and a Citizen Force, which included at least three motorised infantry battalions. The 'permanent force' comprised mostly volunteer auxiliaries and national servicemen, who formed eight battalions. A militia system was also developed for local security, including over twenty 'area protection units'.

By 1981, SWATF's total strength numbered some 10,100 men, organised into both tribal-based battalions (including separate units for Ovambo, Herero, and Coloured ethnic groups) and multiethnic units partially manned by at least 10,000 white South West African personnel.

By 1987, SWATF had an estimated 22,000 troops, including additional units of engineers, signals personnel, mounted troops, a parachute battalion, and a commando squadron.

== Training ==
A school cadet program similar to that in South Africa was developed for South West Africa.

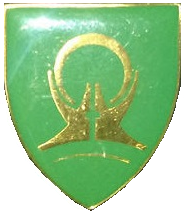
SWATF School Cadet program

Primarily all SWATF members received their initial training at 2 SA Infantry Battalion at Walvis Bay, (considered South African territory at that stage).

Advanced training, NCOs and Officer development however occurred at the SWA Military School at Okhandja.

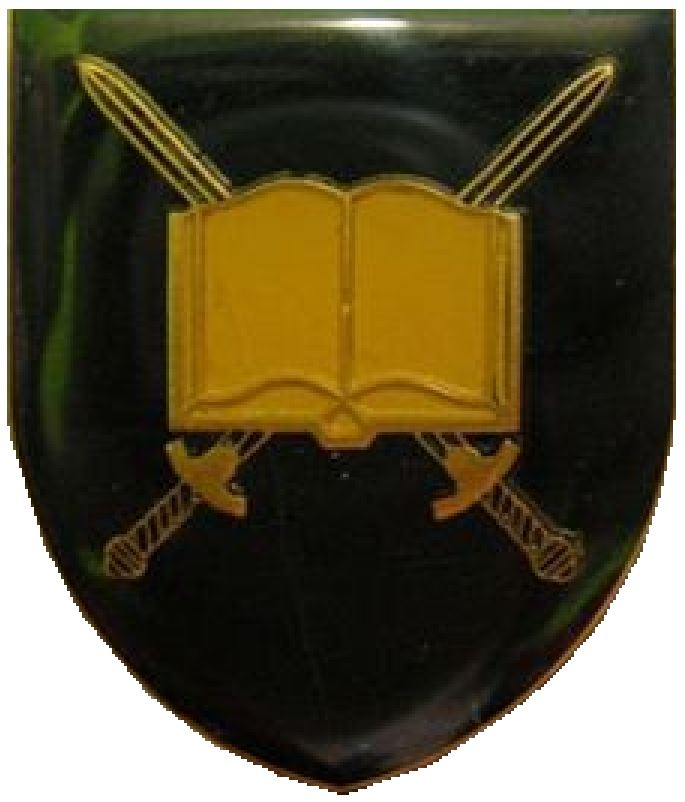
SWATF Military School emblem

== Supervision ==
For all practical purposes, SWATF remained firmly integrated into existing SADF command structures. Its primary goal was protection of the territory of SWA from SWAPO incursions. The SWATF was placed under the control of the Department of Defence for South West Africa and was always headed by a SADF general. There was also a joint SWATF/SADF committee established for "planning, liaison, and coordination" efforts. South West Africa Command also existed and was originally responsible for all of South West Africa but after the establishment of SWATF became responsible for the northern border area.

== Uniform, rank structure, corps emblems, proficiency and ops badges ==
=== Uniforms ===
The first major step in the establishment of an independent territorial defence force in SWA was the introduction of a new nutria uniform on 6 September 1979 through which SWA units could be distinguished from SADF units. The uniforms consist of a two-pocket shirt button up, combat trousers, sweater, jacket or blouse, and or boots. The nutrias are the same for winter and summer and heavier winter gear is issued as needed. Headgear consists of peaked hats, berets, bucket hats, and Orlite helmets.

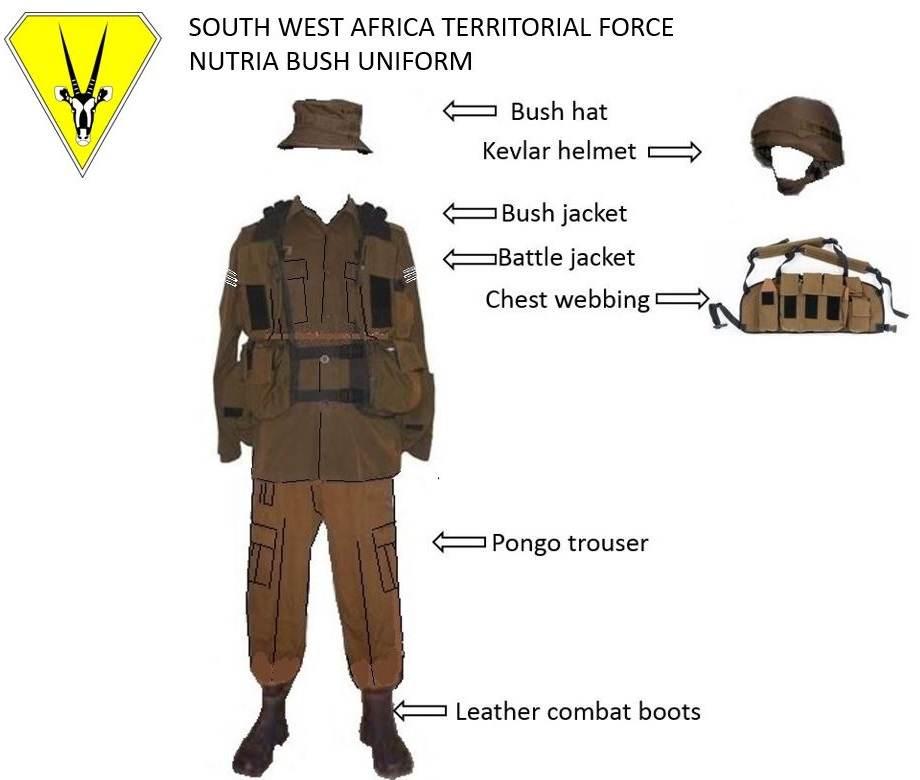

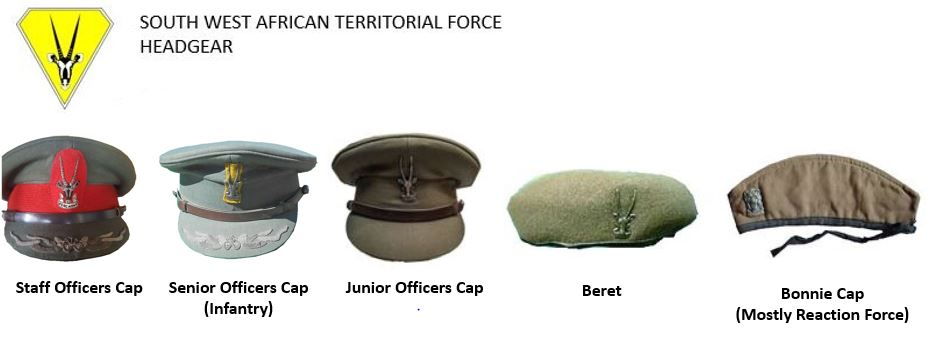

=== Ranks ===
SWATF Rank list on a single image

The rank structure of the SWATF was identical to that of the SADF. The insignia however differed considerably.

| Rank group | General / flag officers | | | Senior officers | | | Junior officers |
|---|---|---|---|---|---|---|---|---|---|
| South West African Army |
| South West African Army | Lieutenant general | Major general | Brigadier | Colonel | Lieutenant colonel | Major | Captain | Lieutenant | Second lieutenant |

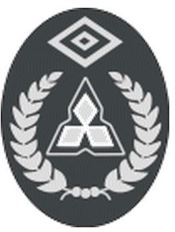
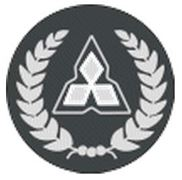
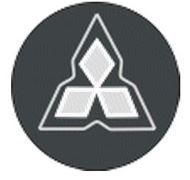
| Rank group | Senior NCOs | | | | | Junior NCOs | | Enlisted |
|---|---|---|---|---|---|---|---|---|
| South West African Army | | | | | | | | No insignia |
| South West African Army | Formation warrant officer | Warrant officer class 1 | Warrant officer class 2 | Staff sergeant | Sergeant | Corporal | Lance corporal | Private |

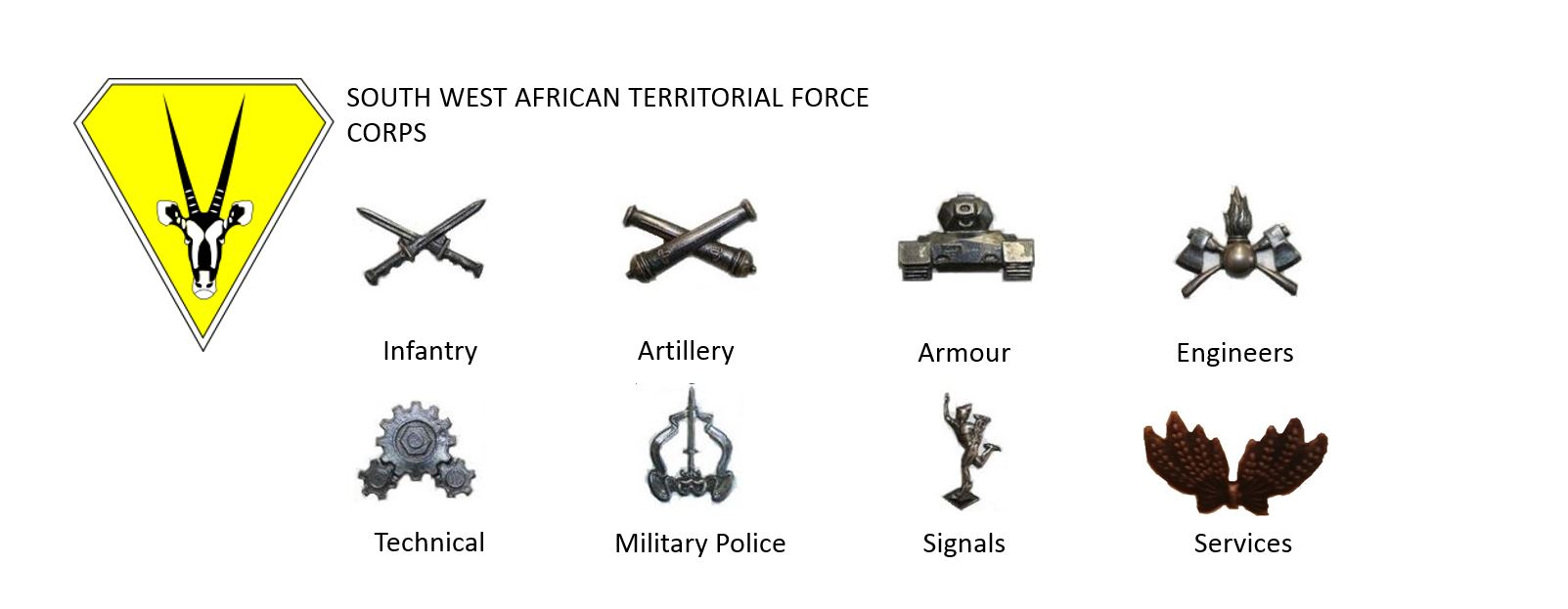

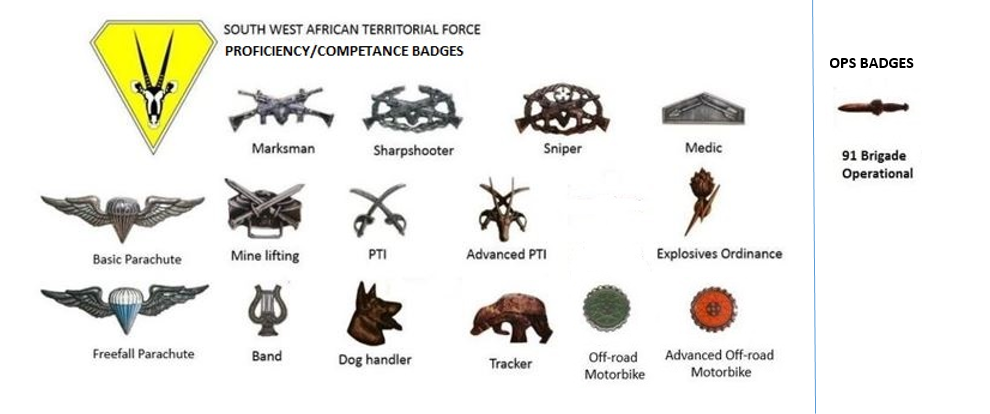

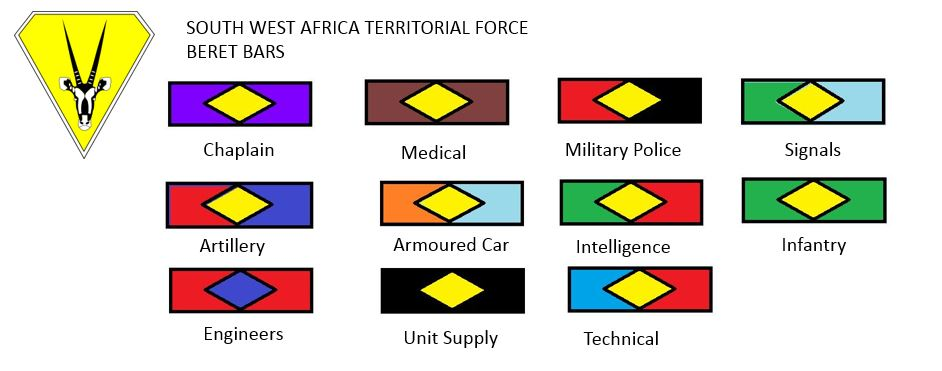

== Commanders ==
| No. | Portrait | Commander | Took office | Left office | Time in office | Ref. |
|---|---|---|---|---|---|---|
| 1 | Charles Lloyd | Major general Charles Lloyd | 1980 | 9 November 1983 | 2–3 years | |
| 2 | Georg Meiring SSA, SD, SM, MMM | Major general Georg Meiring SSA, SD, SM, MMM (1939–2024) | 9 November 1983 | 23 January 1987 | 3 years, 75 days | |
| 3 | Willie Meyer | Major general Willie Meyer | 23 January 1987 | 1989 | 1–2 years | |

== Organization ==
=== Headquarters Formation ===
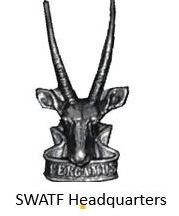
SWATF Headquarters

=== The Reaction Force ===
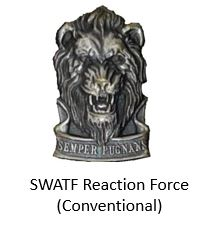
SWATF Reaction Force

==== Brigade ====
- Reaction Force Brigade, mainly a Citizen and cross corps force, 91 Brigade had a motorised sub-brigade composing two (later three) infantry battalions, an armoured car regiment, and an artillery regiment. The Brigade also included a training battalion and a mobilisation center.
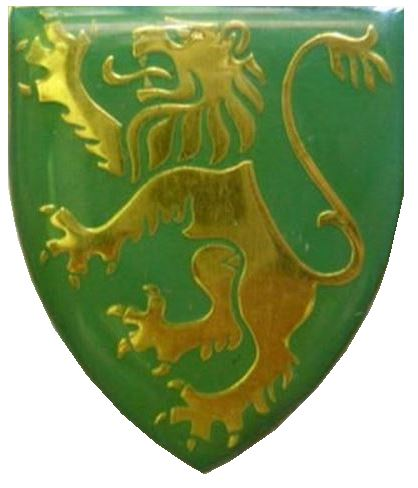
  SWATF 91 Brigade emblem

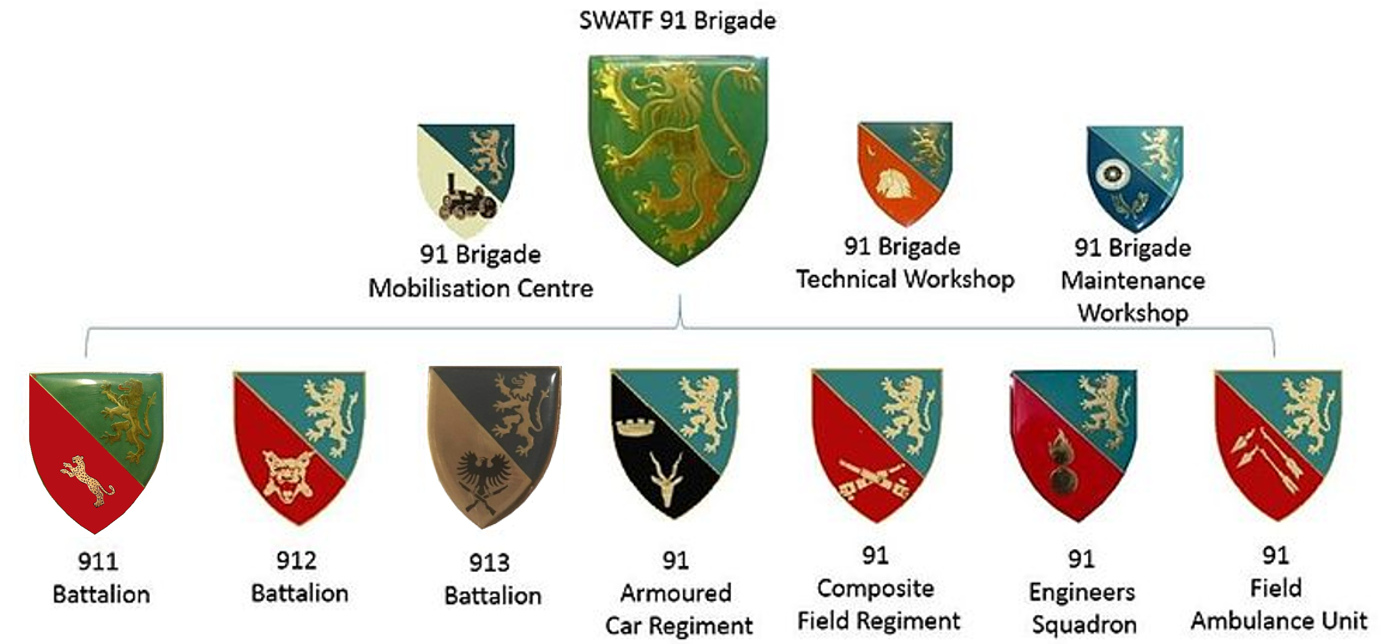

- Logistics Brigade

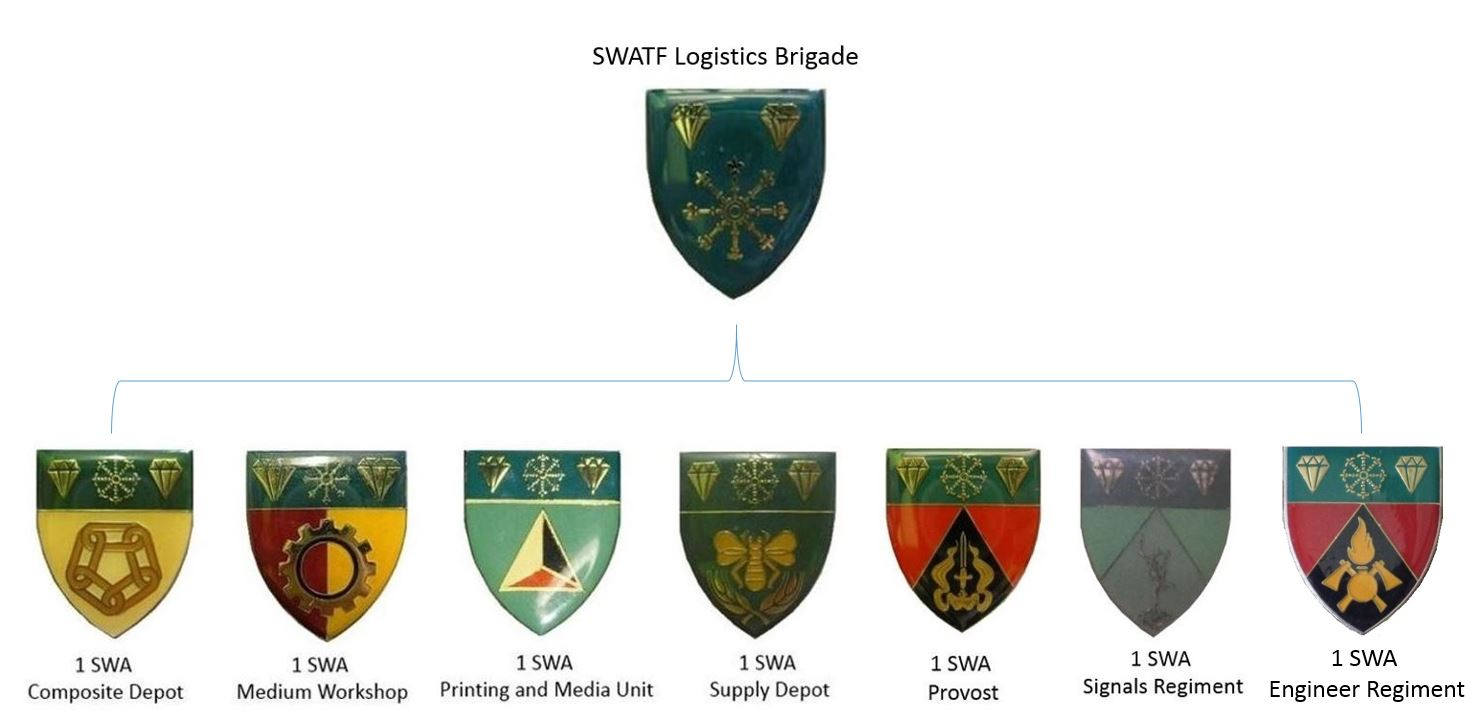

==== Battalions ====
- Eight full-time battalions
  - 31 Bushman Battalion (became 201 Battalion) HQ at Omega Base,
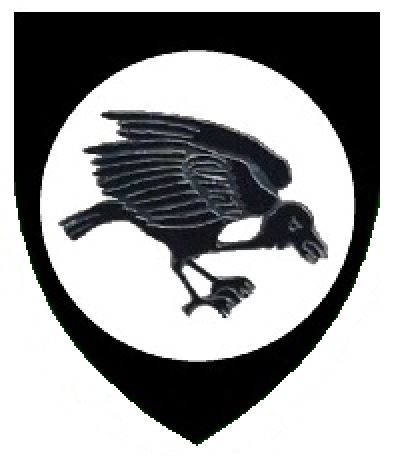
    SWA 31 Battalion emblem
  - 32 Battalion at Buffalo,
  - 33 Eastern Caprivi Battalion, (became 701 Battalion)
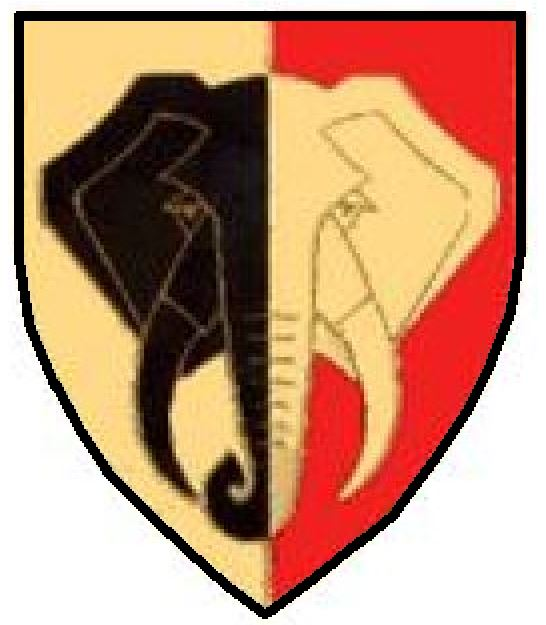
    SWATF 701 Battalion emblem
  - 34 Kavangoland Battalion, (became 202 Battalion)
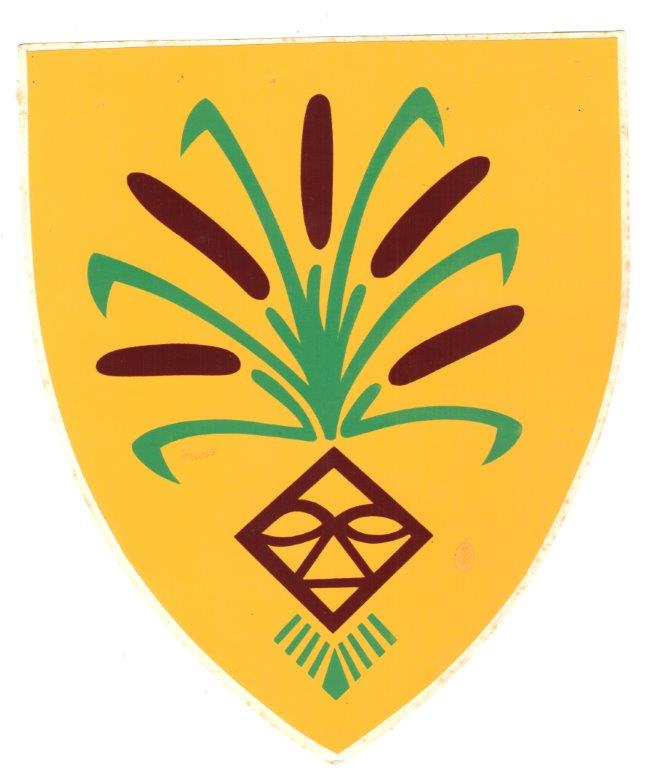
    SWATF 202 Battalion emblem
  - 35 Ovamboland Battalion,
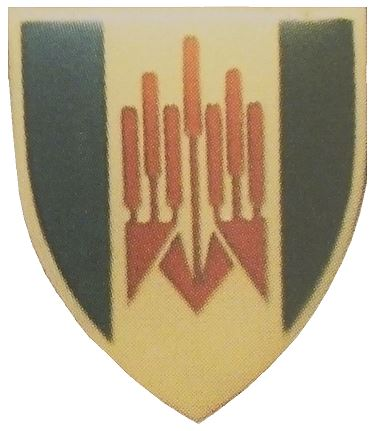
    SWA 101 Battalion emblem
    (became 101 Battalion) The Quick reaction force.
  - 36 Bushman Battalion, (became 203 Battalion)
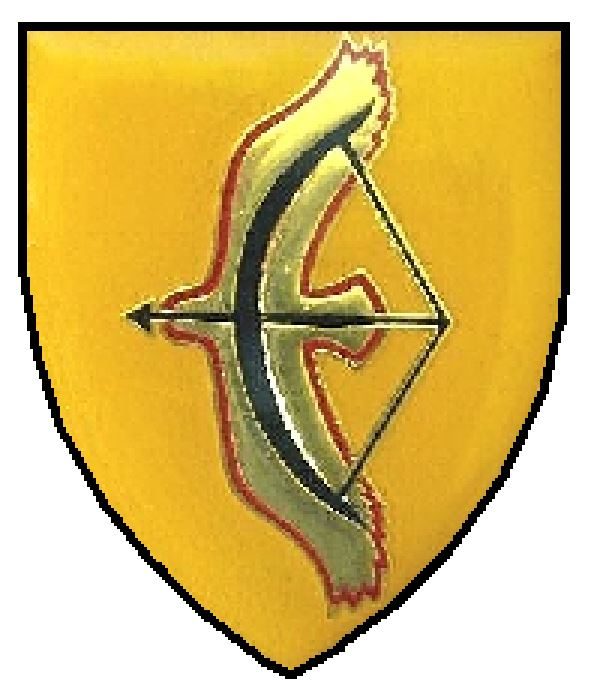
    SWATF 36 203 Battalion emblem
  - 37 Kaokoland Battalion, (became 102 Battalion)
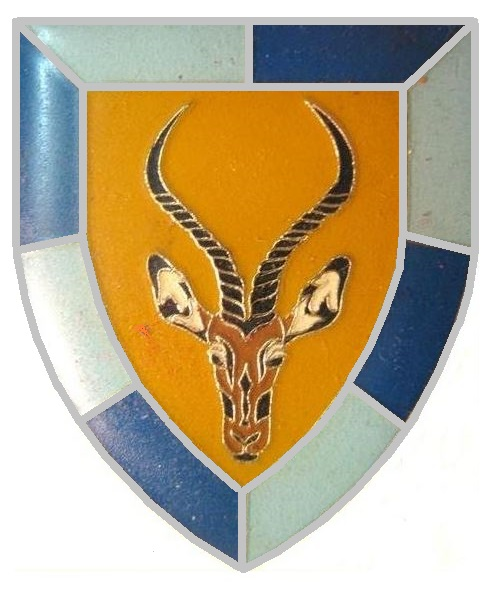
    SWATF 102 Battalion emblem
  - 41 Multi-ethnic Regiment Windhoek (became 911 Battalion) (As 911 Battalion – it became known as "Swing Force" due to its ability to operate as a conventional unit or as a Counter-insurgency (COIN) unit.
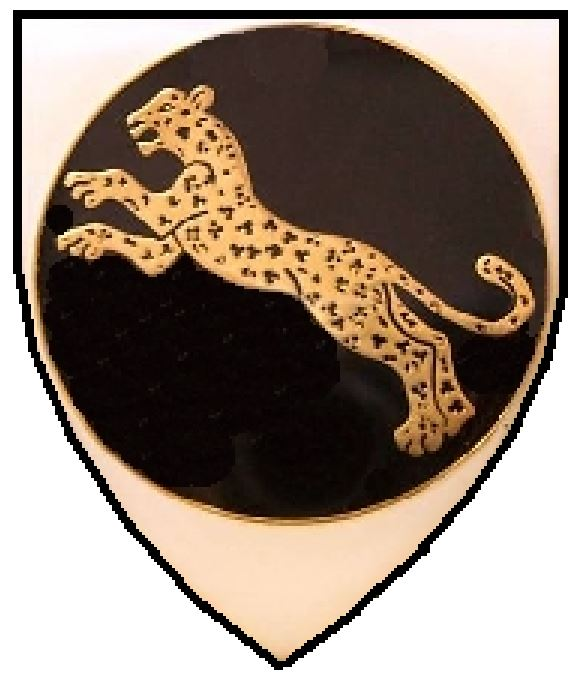
    SWATF 911 Battalion emblem
    It recruited from South West Africa at large and deployed predominantly as a reserve force. An infantry element, a mechanised contingent, artillery, and a regiment of Eland armoured cars was included. The unit was never mobilised en masse.

==== SWATF Special Forces ====
Although SWATF relied heavily on South Africa's special forces, over time it developed its own capability.

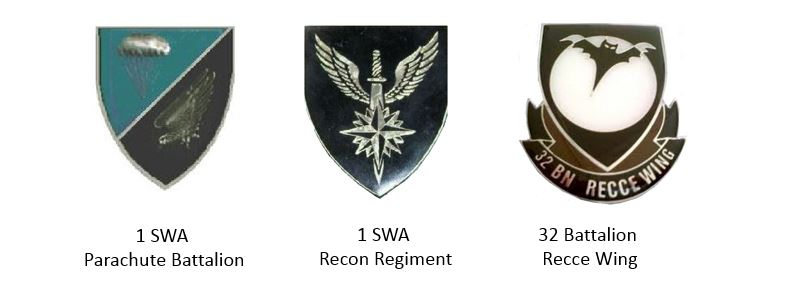
SWATF Special Forces

- 1 SWA Recon Regiment: started out as a sub unit under the command of the Commanding General SWATF in 1982, staffed mainly by ex South African operators.
- Front-line Recon Wings: most front-line battalions, such as 31, 36 and 101 also had their own Recon Wings.

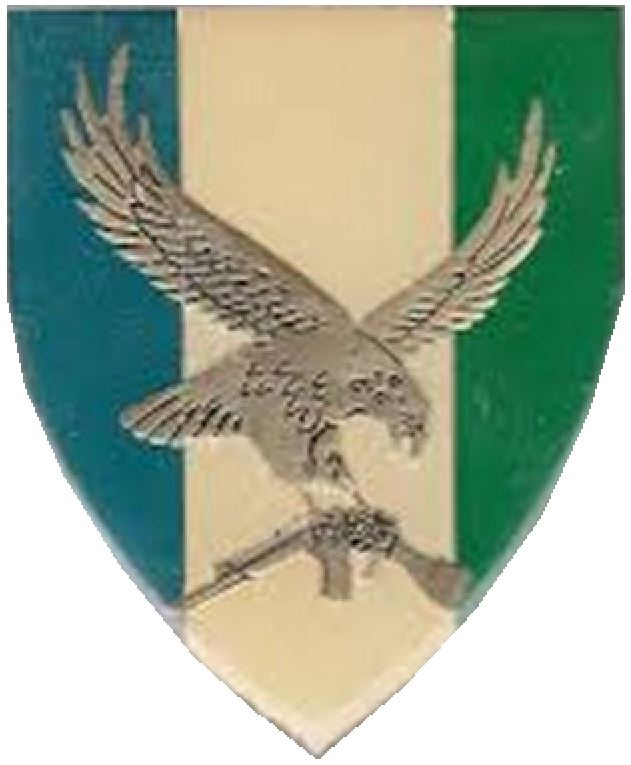
SWATF 101 Battalion Recon Wing emblem

- 1 SWA Specialist Unit:
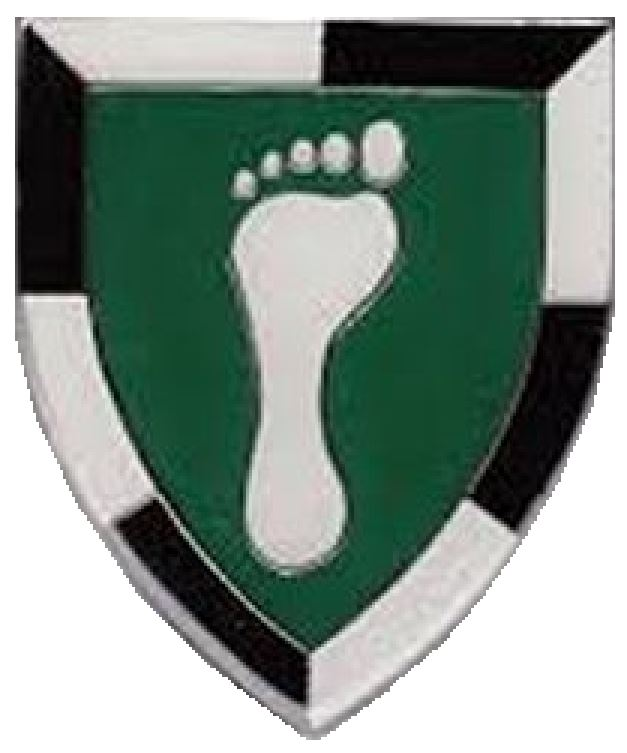
  SWATF 1 Spes emblem
  at Otavi – containing trackers, dogs, horses and dirt bikes. By 1984, 1 SWA SPES was based at Omaruku and at Omathoni together with 32 Battalion's Recce Wing.
- 1 SWA Parachute Battalion: By 1987, 1 SWA Parachute Battalion and 32 Battalion's Recce Wing were amalgamated to become 2 SWA Specialist Unit or 2 SWA SPES and relocated to Luipersvallei, Windhoek.

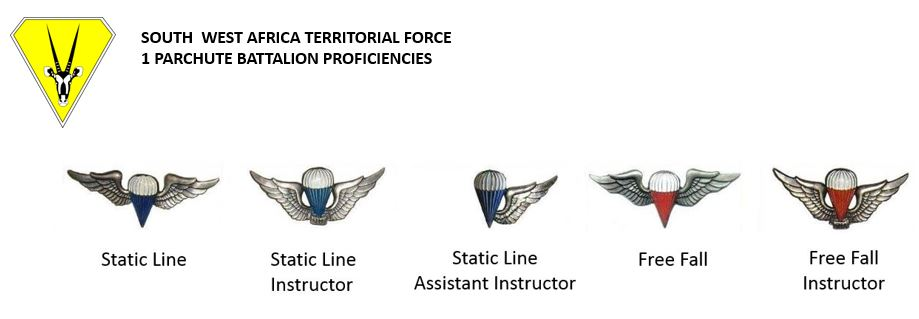
SWATF 1 SWA Parachute Battalion proficiencies

=== The Area Force ===
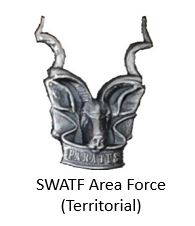
SWATF Area Force

==== South West African Military Operations Sectors ====
By 1979, South West Africa was subdivided into Operational Sectors. Three Frontline Sectors, 10, 20 and 70 fell under direct control of the South Africa Defence Force's South West Africa Command. Four additional Sectors, 30, 40, 50 and 60 covered the rest of South West Africa and was commanded directly by SWATF officers from 1980.

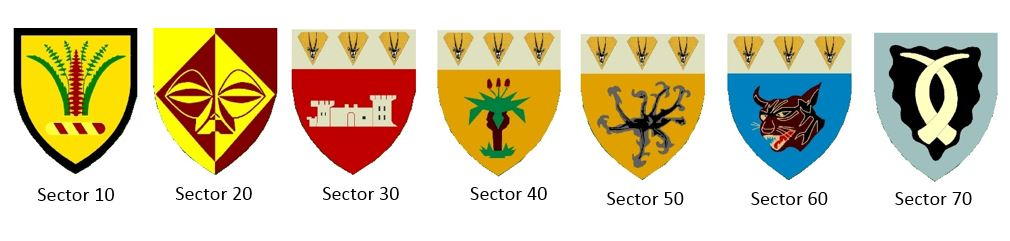

==== Frontline Sectors ====
Frontline Sectors were used for the massing of forces in preparation for external operations into Angola, acting as a buffer with the rest of the territory and reaction to immediate threats.

Although theoretically under control of the Area Force, due to their proximity to Angola the vast majority of conventional forces was based in these areas and remained under the direct control of South West Africa Command, a SADF regional command.

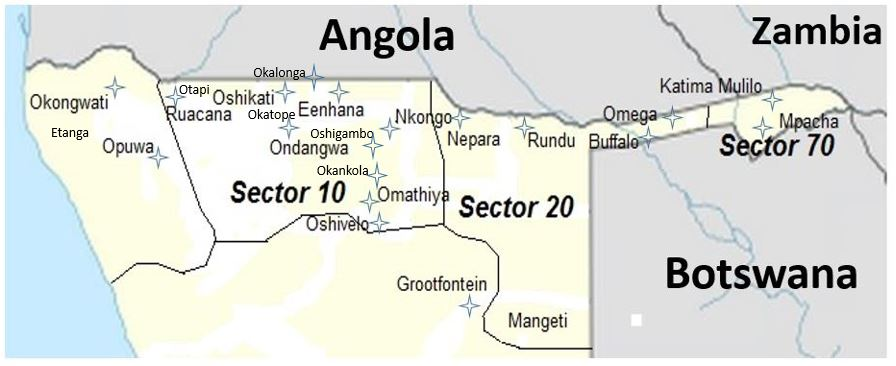

==== Sector 10 ====
(Kaokoland and Owambo) – HQ Oshakati

- SADF's 51 Battalion at Ruacana,
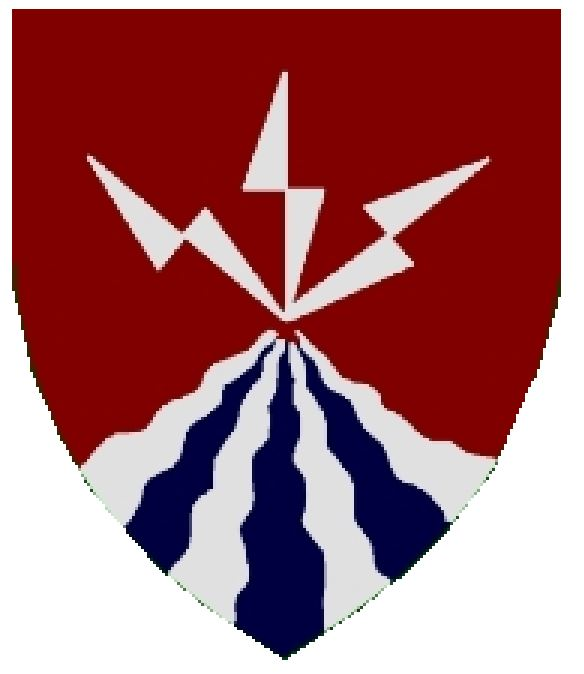
  51 SADF Battalion
- SADF's 52 Battalion at Ogongo,
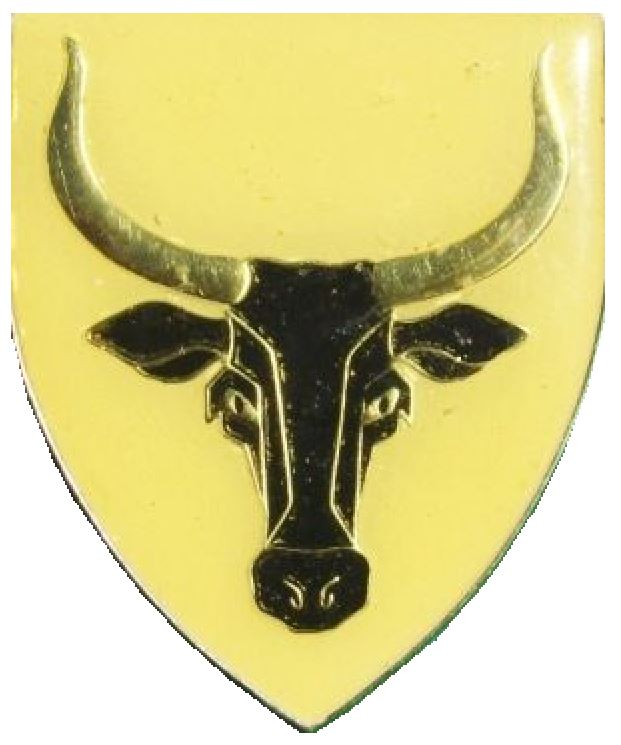
  SADF 52 Battalion emblem
- SADF's 53 Battalion at Ondangwa,
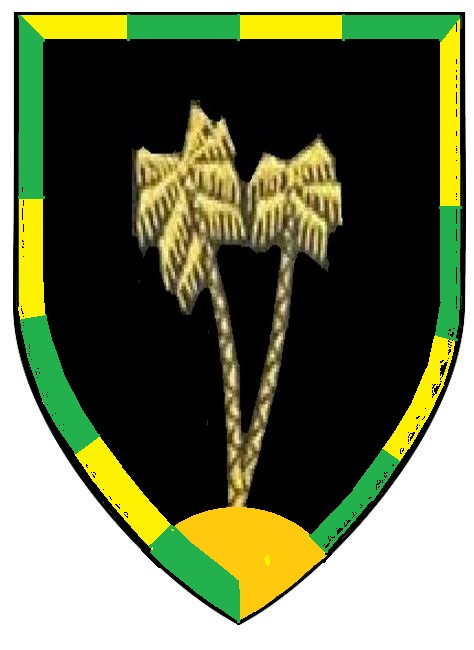
  SADF 53 Battalion emblem
- SADF's 54 Battalion at Eenhana,
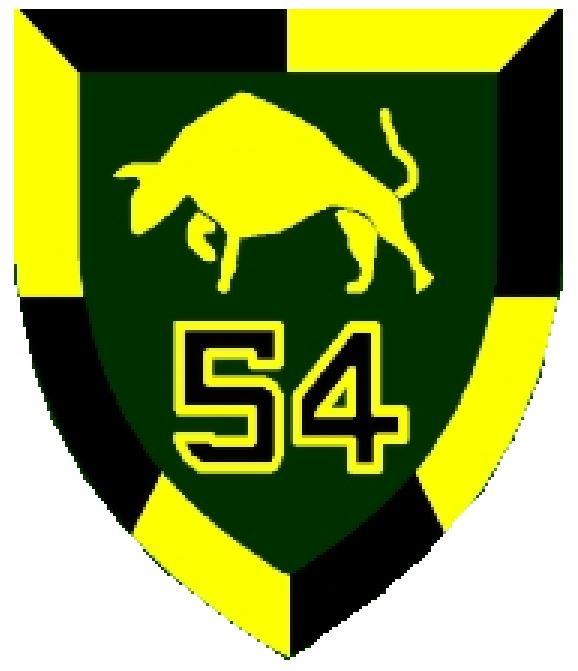
  SADF 54 battalion
- 101 Battalion at Ondangwa and
- 102 Battalion at Opuwa,

===== Combined SADF and SWATF forces in Sector 10 =====
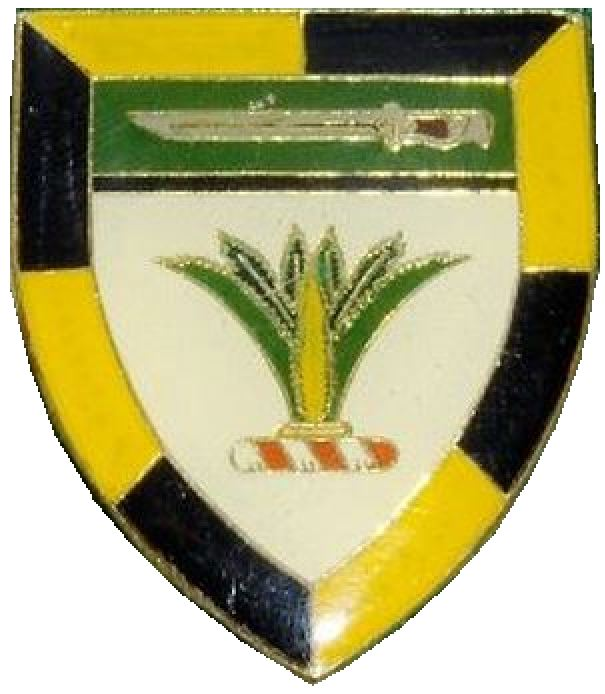
SWATF Oshivelo Training Unit emblem

- SADF's Air Force Base Ondangwa,
- SADF's 5 Maintenance Unit at Ondangwa,
- SADF's Sector 10 Training Unit at Oshivelo,

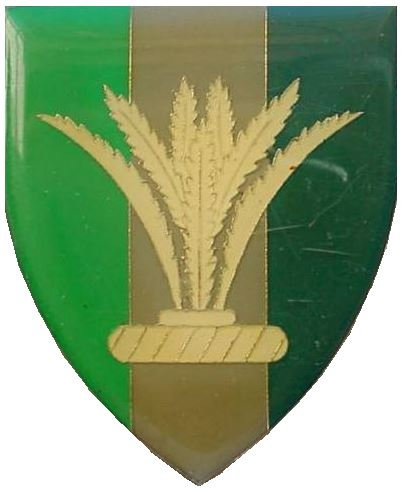
SWATF Sector 10 Signals Unit emblem

- SADF's Sector 10 Signals Unit at Oshakati,
- SADF's Sector 10 Maintenance Unit at Oshakati,
- SADF's Sector 10 Provost Unit at Oshakati,
- SADF's 25 Engineering Squadron at Oshakati, and
- SADF's 61 Mechanised Battalion Group at Omuthiya (although not SWATF, 61 Mech had its origins in South West Africa)

==== Sector 20 ====
(Kavango and Western Caprivi) – HQ Rundu

- SADF's 55 Battalion at Nepara.
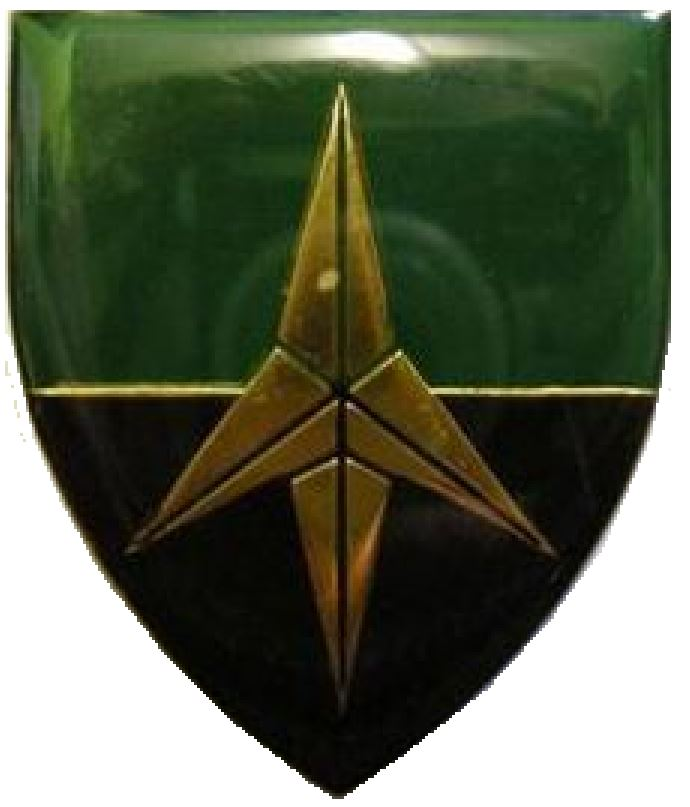
  SADF 55 Battalion
- 32 Battalion at Buffalo.
- 201 Battalion at Omega base,
- 202 Battalion at Rundu and
- 203 Battalion at Mangeti.

===== Special Service Companies for quick reaction =====
These frontline Sectors also had immediate reaction forces (Special Service Companies) to deal with any attack and were primarily infantry company strength and fully motorised.

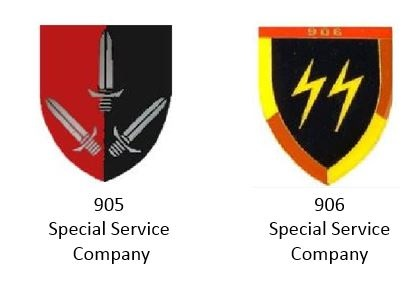
SWATF Reaction Forces

- 905 SSC was based at Nepara in Sector 20 and deployed on Buffels.
- 906 SSC was based at Omahoni in Sector 20 and deployed on Buffels. Local Kwanyama troops made up the bulk of the personnel.

===== SADF units in Sector 20 =====
- SADF's Air Force Base Rundu and
- SADF's 6 Maintenance Unit at Rundu.

==== Sector 70 ====
(Eastern Caprivi) – HQ Mpacha Encompassed the Eastern Caprivi covering the Zambian border from Cuado to the Zambezi River.

- SWATF 701 Battalion, at Mpacha with attached SWATF armoured car and artillery battery.
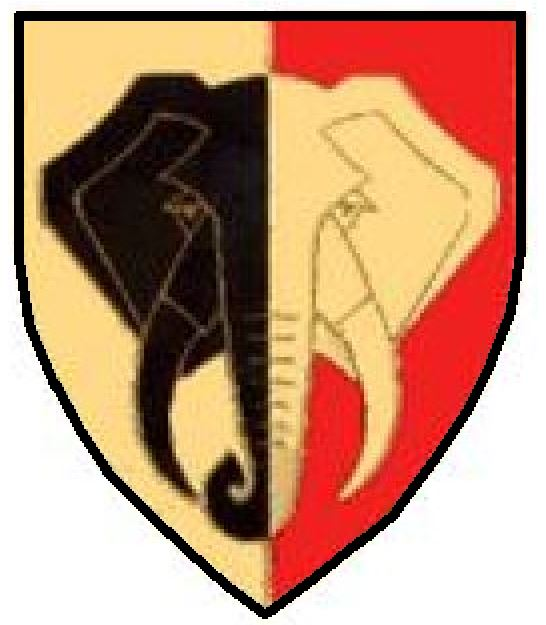
  SWATF 701 Battalion emblem

===== SADF units in Sector 70 =====
- SADF's Air Force Base at Mpacha,
- SADF's Navy Marine Company utilized for river patrols, and
- SADF's 9 Maintenance Unit at Mpacha.

==== Countrywide Sectors ====
Apart from the Frontline Sectors, four additional Sectors existed. 26 Area Force Units, similar to the South African commando system, was established for these less vulnerable parts of the territory.

==== Sector 30 ====
HQ Otjiwarongo (Citadel).

- 301 Bn at Otjiwarongo.
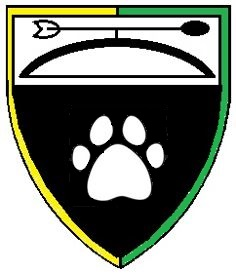
  SWA 301 Battalion emblem

SWATF Otjiwarongo AME (Area Force Unit – Area Mag Eenheid), Outjo AME, Grootfontein AME, Tsumeb AME, Hereroland AME, Etosha AME, Otavi AME, Damaraland AME and UIS PL. Its area of responsibility was likewise the Grootfontein, Tsumeb, Otavi, Outjo, Otjiwarongo, Hereroland and Damaraland regions.

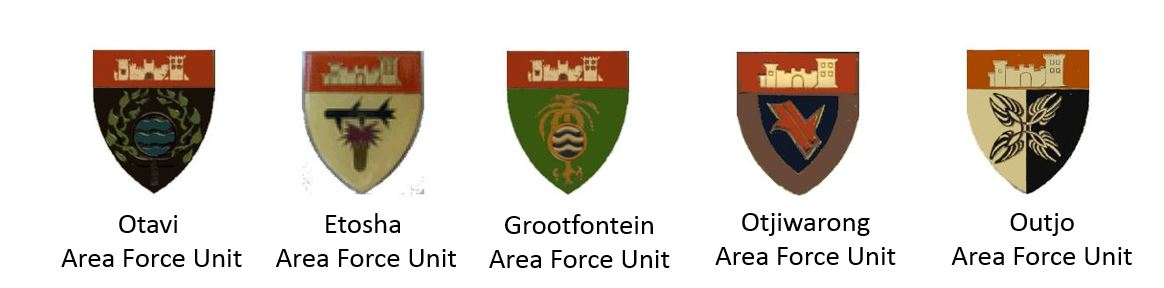

===== SADF Units in Sector 30 =====
- SADF's Air Force Base Grootfontein
- SADF's Northern Logistics Command at Grootfontein comprising:
  - NLC 101 Workshop
  - NLC Provost Unit
  - NLC 6 Signals Unit
  - NLC 16 Maintenance Unit

==== Sector 40 ====
HQ Windhoek.

SWATF Alte Feste AME, Khomas AME, Hochl AME, Okahandja AME, Omaruru AME, Swakopmund AME, Rehoboth AME, Katatura AME and Khomasdal AME.

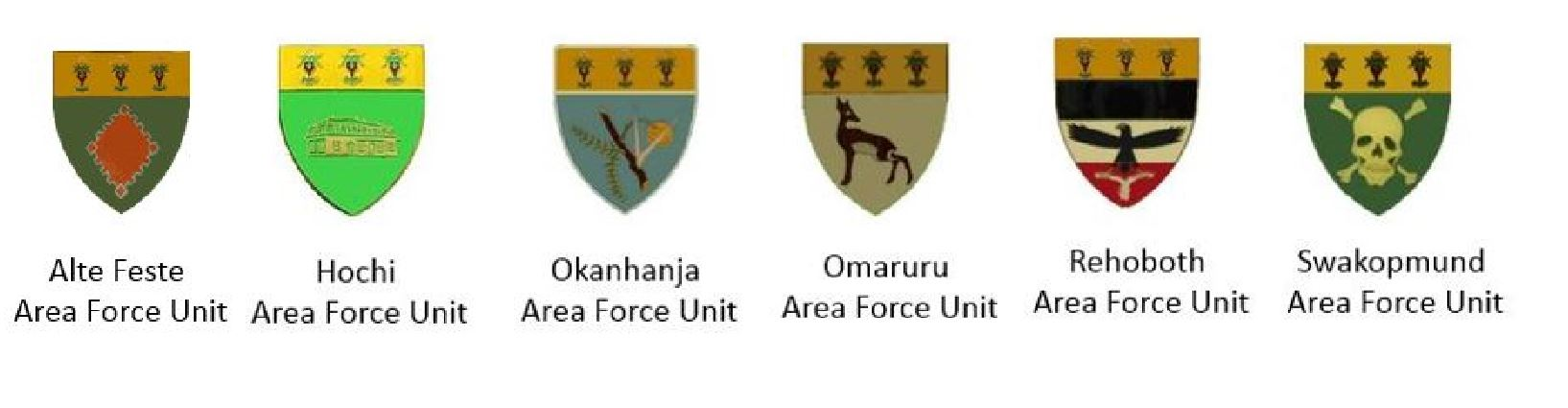

Other Units in this Sector:

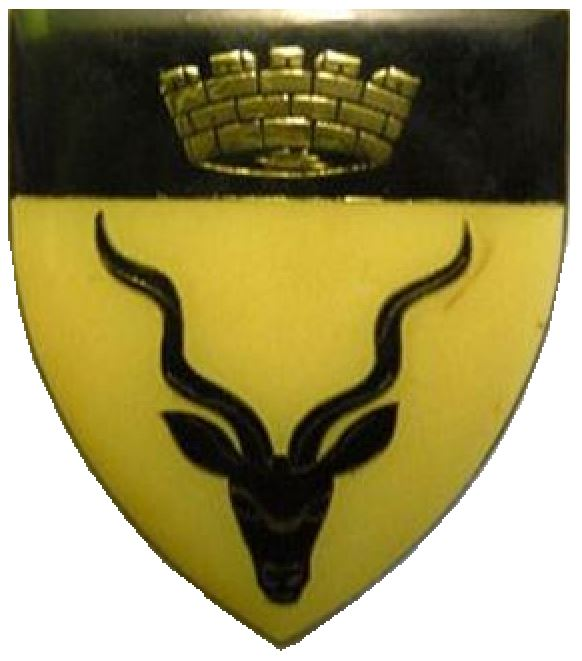
SWATF Regiment Windhoek emblem

- Regiment Windhoek

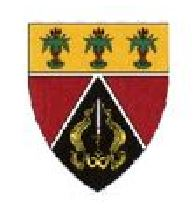
SWATF 1 SWA Provost emblem

- 1 SWA Provost Unit

==== Sector 50 ====
HQ Gobabis.

SWATF Aranos AME, Auob AME, Bo-Nossob AME, Aminius PL, Gobabis AME, Rietfont AME, Mariental AME and Maltahohe AME.

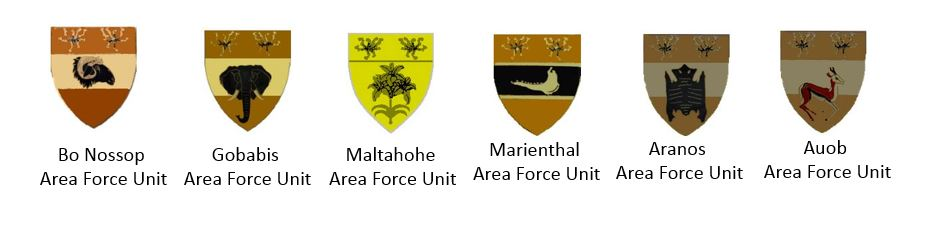

==== Sector 60 ====
HQ Keetmanshoop.

SWATF Karasburg AME, Keetmanshop AME, Hoop AME, Bethanien AME, Oranjemund AME, Luderitz AME and Namaland AME.

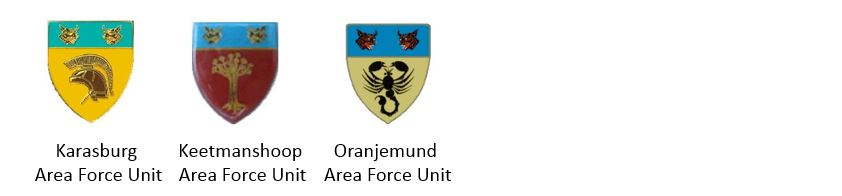

=== Air Wing ===
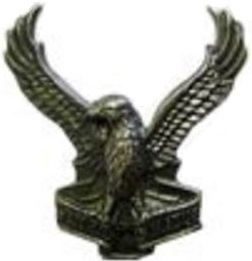
SWATF Air Wing

==== Aircrews ====
While the SWATF relied heavily on the South African Air Force for combat and heavy logistics transportation, it did have its own Air Wing, which consisted mainly of civilian aircraft.

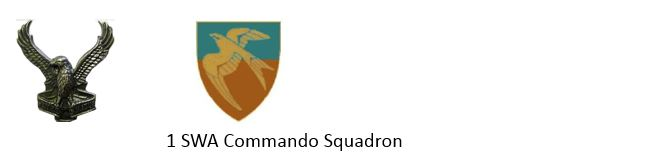

1 SWA Commando Squadron was established as 112 Air Commando on 24 September 1963 in Windhoek. The unit was staffed by volunteer civilian aircraft. From 1968, control of 112 Commando squadron passed from the SA Army to the SAAF and it was transferred to Light Aircraft Command. In 1970, it was disbanded, but in 1980 it was re-established as part of the SWATF.

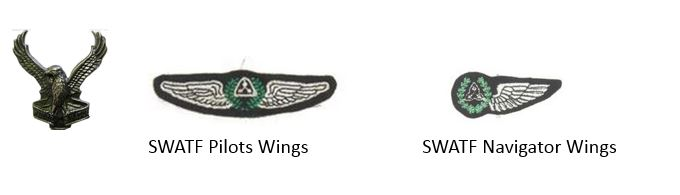

=== Medical Command ===
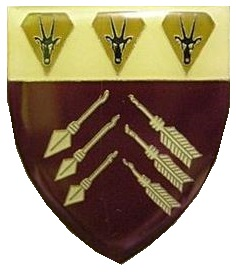
SWATF Medical Command emblem

== Equipment ==
=== Small arms ===
| Name | Type | Country of Origin | Notes |
|---|---|---|---|
| Beretta 92 | Semi-automatic pistol | Italy | |
| Star | Semi-Automatic Pistol | Spain | Model 1920, 1921, 1922. |
| Uzi | Submachine gun | Israel | Some of local manufacture. |
| AK-47 | Assault Rifle | Soviet Union | Captured. |
| AKM | Assault Rifle | Soviet Union | Captured. |
| R1 | Battle Rifle | Belgium | Belgian design |
| Heckler & Koch G3 | Battle Rifle | West Germany | G3A3, received from Portugal. |
| R4 | Assault Rifle | South Africa | Derived from the IMI Galil |
| Bren | Light machine gun | United Kingdom | Mk 3. |
| Browning M2 | Heavy machine gun | United States | |
| Browning M1919 | Medium machine gun | United States | Helicopter-mounted weapon. |
| FN MAG | General purpose machine gun | Belgium | MAG-58. |
| SS-77 machine gun | General purpose machine gun | South Africa | |
| PKM | General purpose machine gun | Soviet Union | Captured. |
| RPD | Light machine gun | Soviet Union | Captured. |
| RPK | Light machine gun | Soviet Union | Captured. |
| FN Browning Auto-5 | Shotgun | United States | |
| Armsel Striker | Shotgun | South Africa | |
| Dragunov | Sniper rifle | Soviet Union | Captured. |
| Armscor M963 | Fragmentation grenade | South Africa | Made in South Africa, derived from INDEP's licence-made M26 grenade |
| Armscor 42 Zulu | Anti-personnel rifle grenade | South Africa | Derived from the Belgian PRB 424 |
| Armscor AP-65 | Anti-personnel rifle grenade | South Africa | Successor to the 42 Zulu, utilising a M26 and resembling a Dilagrama m/65 |
| Mecar Energa | Anti-tank rifle grenade | Belgium | Made in South Africa |
| M18 Claymore | Anti-personnel mine | United States | |
| Mine G.S. Mk V | Anti-tank mine | United Kingdom | |
| M79 grenade launcher | Grenade Launcher | United States | Known as "snotneus" |
| Milkor MGL | Grenade Launcher | South Africa | |
| M20 Super Bazooka | Anti-tank weapon | United States | 3.5 inch rocket launcher. |
| STRIM 89mm rocket launcher | Anti-tank weapon | France | M20 replacement. |
| RPG-2 | Anti-tank weapon | Soviet Union | Captured. |
| RPG-7 | Anti-tank weapon | Soviet Union | Captured. |

=== Vehicles ===
==== Armoured ====
- Buffel APC/MRAP
- Casspir APC/MRAP
- Eland Mk7 Armoured Car
- Wolf APC manufactured by Windhoeker Maschinenfabrik

==== Soft-skinned ====
- Samil 20
- Samil 50
- Samil 100
- Kwêvoël 100
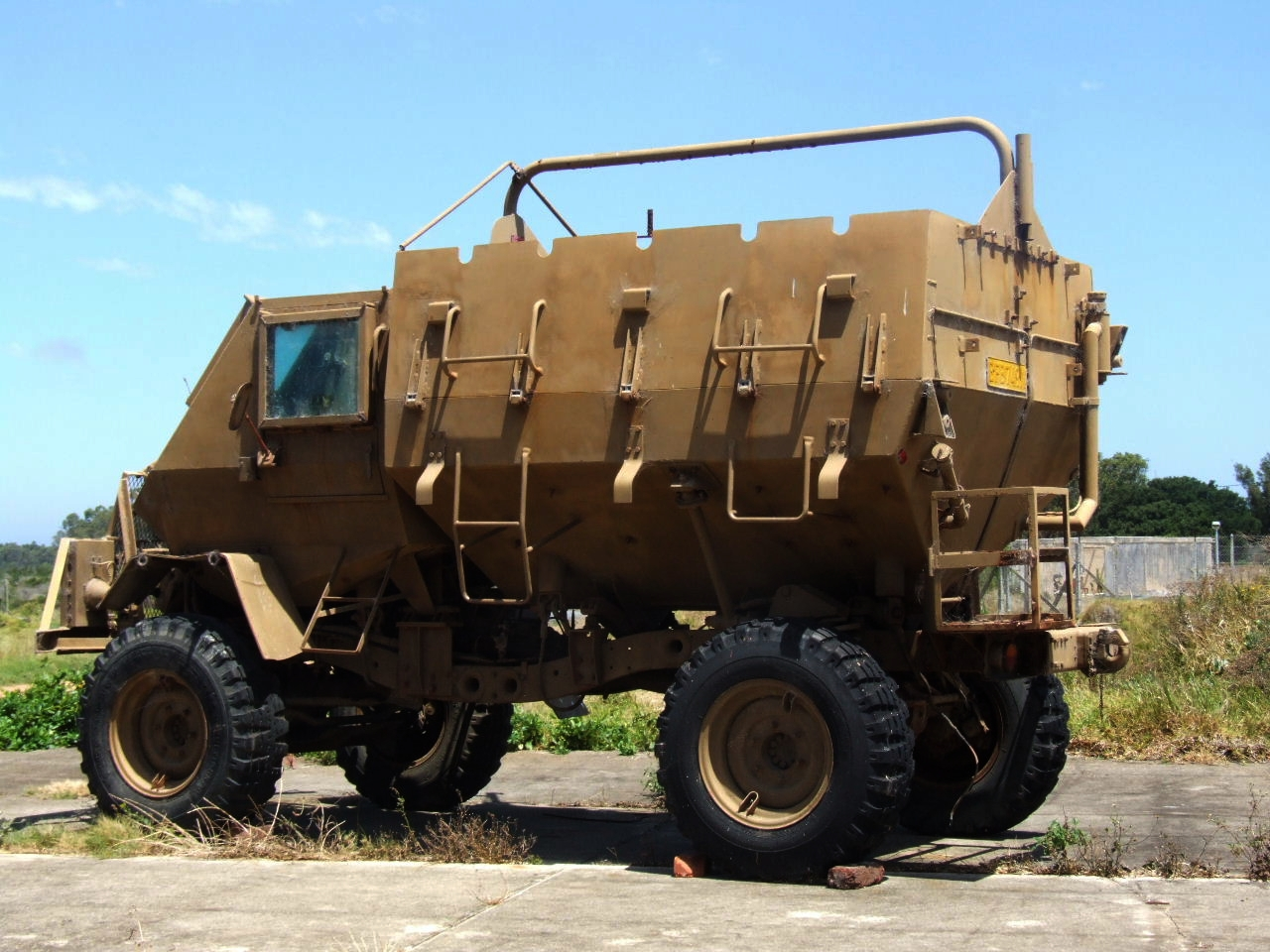
Buffel armoured personnel carrier (1978)

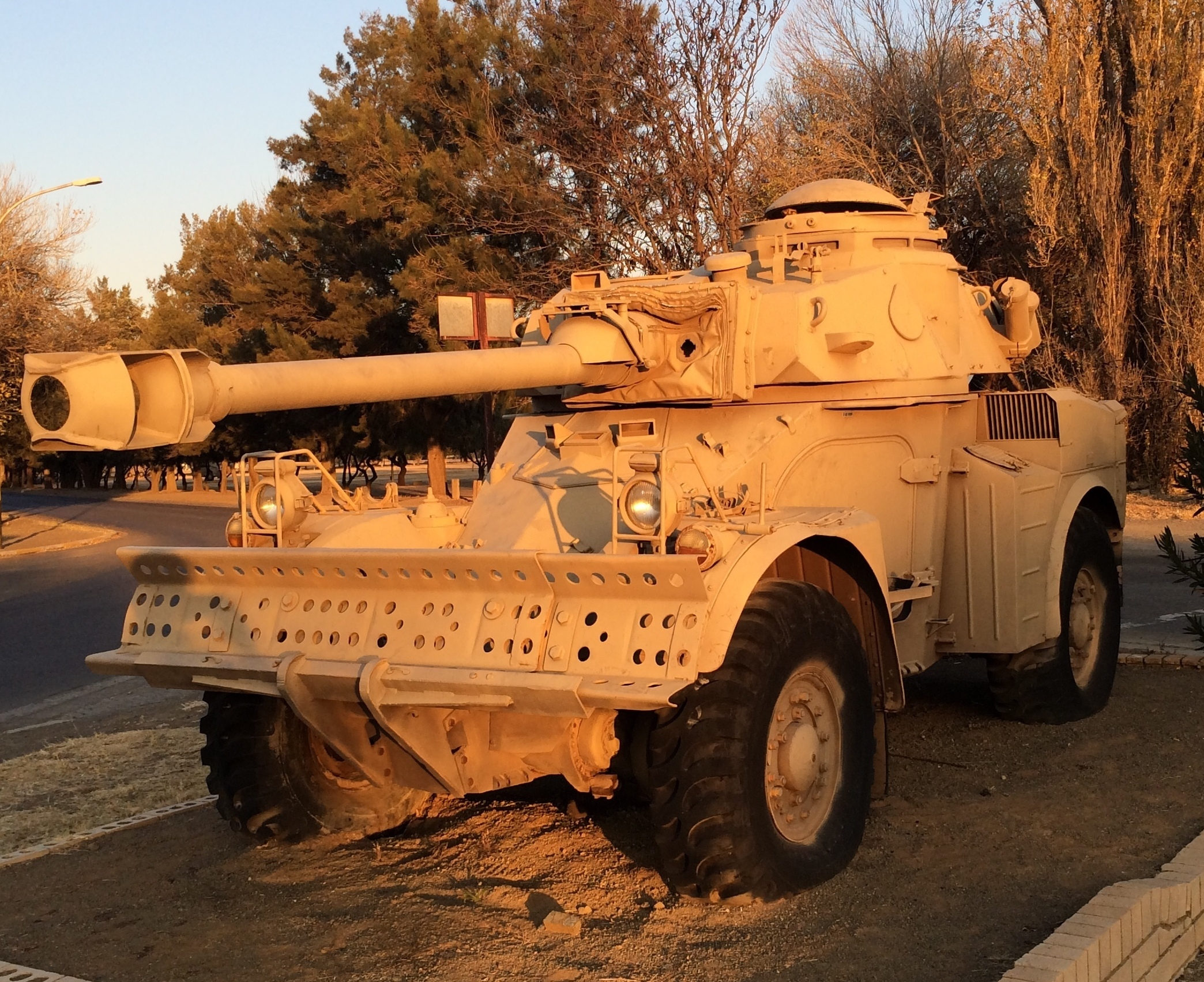
Eland Mk7 Armoured Car

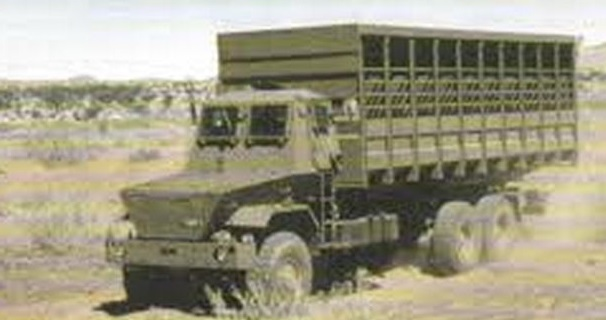
Kwêvoël 100 horse carrier

== Counterinsurgency ==
A lot of effort was used to interdict insurgent groups that had crossed over the Angolan border. These Insurgents were on foot, but knew the land and moved fast. There have been stories of the insurgents moving incredible distances with little supplies, whilst being chased and if cornered putting up a good resistance to their followers. Adrenaline injections were found at some of the incident scenes after a fire fight.

These insurgents were normally stalked by using trained trackers, who directed the reaction force. In some instances a stopper group was choppered in to cut off the insurgents before they reached the border.

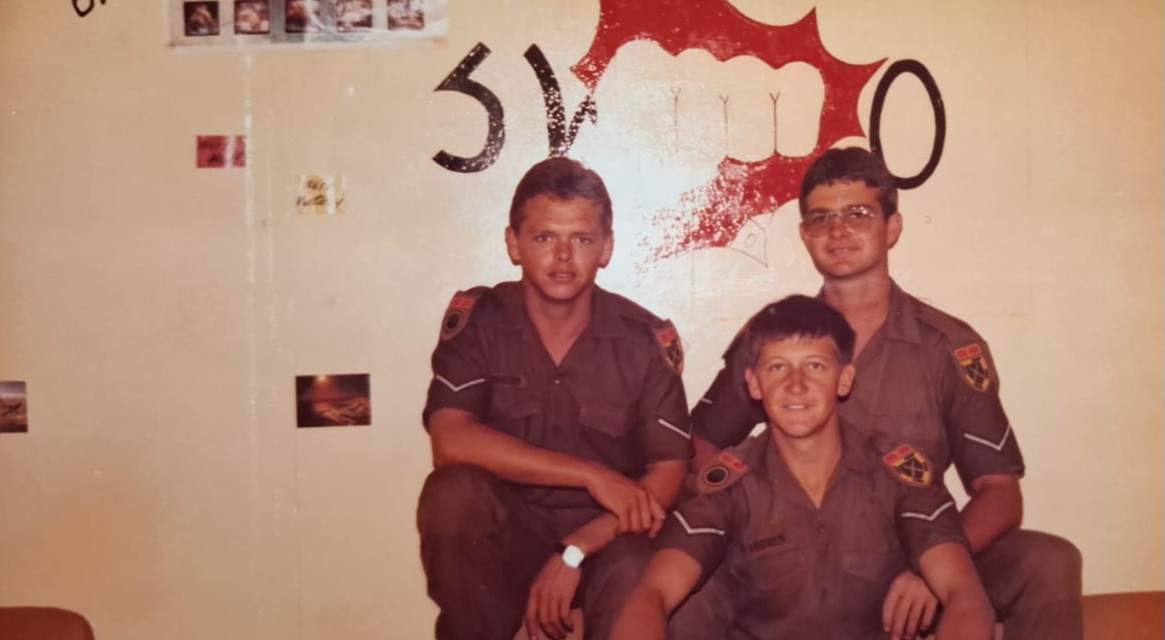
Stephan Grobler and two other SADF soldiers during Jnr Leaders training (Basics) in Oudtshoorn Infantry training school, Stephan (who is on the left) later became an Officer over a Platoon in the 301 Battalion but the other 2 soldiers have yet to be identified

301 Battalion was a great example of a Counter insurgency SWATF Battalion, playing a major role in defending Tsinsabis and Tsumeb, defending roughly 11,000 Civilians.

== Demobilisation ==
Under UN resolution 435, the United Nations Transition Assistance Group was mobilised, while SWATF was demobilised, its strength in the last years of operation was at about 22,000. Special arrangements were made for two San units of SWATF, as they originated from local tribal communities. They were thus allocated land near their previous bases.

All citizen force units were demobilised.

The SWATF was completely demobilised on 1 June 1989.

== Withdrawal of some units to South Africa ==
UN Resolution 435 additionally called on South Africa to reduce its forces in Namibia to 12,000 before the start of any peace process and finally to 1,500 by 1989. Several thousand former SWATF members, especially from the San people who feared reprisals or intimidation, left for South Africa with the withdrawing SADF.

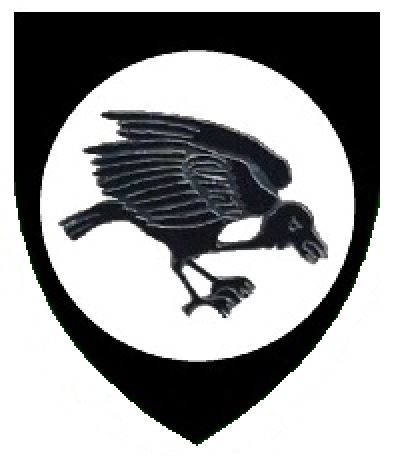
SWA 31 Battalion emblem

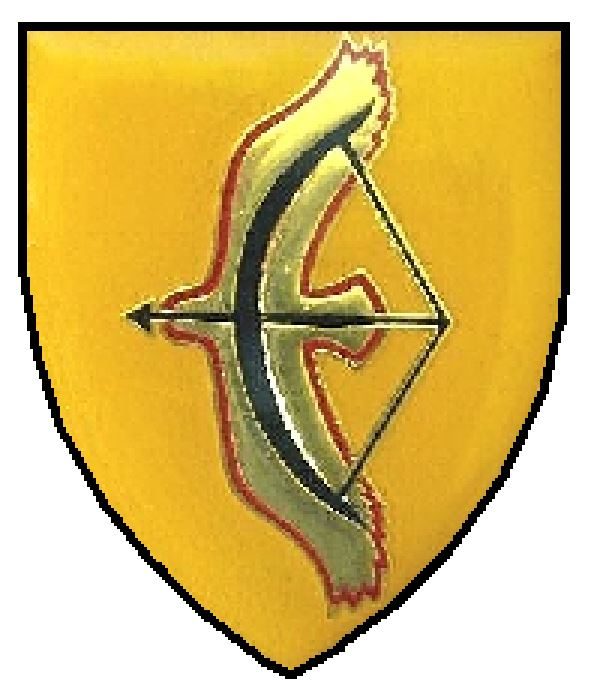
SWATF 36 203 Battalion emblem

32 Battalion, whose members to a large extent could not claim Namibian citizenship, also withdrew to South Africa completely.

== See also ==
- Koevoet
- Namibian Defence Force
- South West African Police (SWAPOL)
