= Aubrey Sedibe =

South African military commander

Lieutenant General / Dr Aubrey Phegelelo Sedibe DMG MMS MMB OStJ MBChB
- Born: 1957 (age 68–69); Alexandra Township, Gauteng, South Africa
- Military career
- Allegiance: South Africa
- Branch: South African Military Health Service
- Rank: Lieutenant General
- Commands: Surgeon General; GOC 1 Military Hospital
- Awards: Decoration for Merit DMG Merit Medal MMS Merit Medal MMB Operational Medal for Southern Africa South Africa Service Medal Unitas (Unity) Medal Mandela Commemoration Medal Medalje vir Troue Diens (Medal for Loyal Service) Good Service Medal Service Medal Venerable Order of Saint John OStJ

Lieutenant General Aubrey Phegelelo Sedibe DMG MMS MMB OStJ MBChB is a South African military commander. A medical doctor, he served in uMkhonto we Sizwe (MK), the military wing of the African National Congress, during the liberation struggle against the South African government in the 1980s, and transferred to the South African National Defence Force when MK was integrated to form it in 1994.

== Early life ==
He was born in Alexandra Township in 1957.

== Military career ==
After the uprising of 1976, he was decided to join the MK in exile. He completed his military training from 1977 to 1979 in Mozambique, Angola and the Soviet Union.

He was sent to Germany for medical studies, completing his Bachelor in Medicine (MBChB) and internship in 1993. He returned to South Africa in 1994 to join the South African Military Health Service (SAMHS).

Before taking over as Surgeon General on 1 April 2013 he was the Chief Director Military Health Force Preparation

== Awards and decorations ==
Medical Doctor (Qualification)
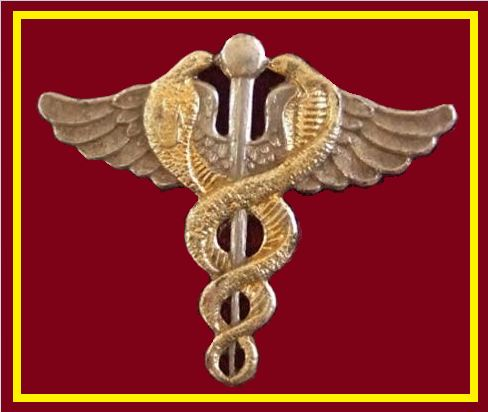
Chest Insignia. Gilt and Enamel.

- Decoration for Merit (Gold) (DMG)
- Merit Medal (Silver) (MMS)
- Merit Medal (Bronze) (MMB)
- Operational Medal for Southern Africa
- South Africa Service Medal
- Unitas (Unity) Medal
- Mandela Commemoration Medal (Gold)
- Medalje vir Troue Diens (Medal for Loyal Service) (30 Year Clasp)
- Good Service Medal (Silver (20 Years))
- Service Medal (Bronze)
- Venerable Order of Saint John (Gr IV - Officer) (OStJ) (Great Britain)

== See also ==
- List of South African military chiefs
- South African Medical Service

Military offices
Preceded by Vejaynand Ramlakan	Chief of the South African Military Health Service; 2013–2019	Succeeded by Zola Dabula
Preceded by Brig Gen Lindile Yam	Director Physical Training Sports & Recreation; 2005–2010	Succeeded by Brig Gen Gordon Yekelo
Preceded by Brig Gen Andre Lötter	GOC 1 Military Hospital; 2001–2005	Succeeded by Zola Dabula
