= Refiloe Johannes Mudimu =

South African Navy Admiral

Vice Admiral Refiloe Johannes Mudimu CLS DMG SM MMS MMM MMB SAN (Rtd)
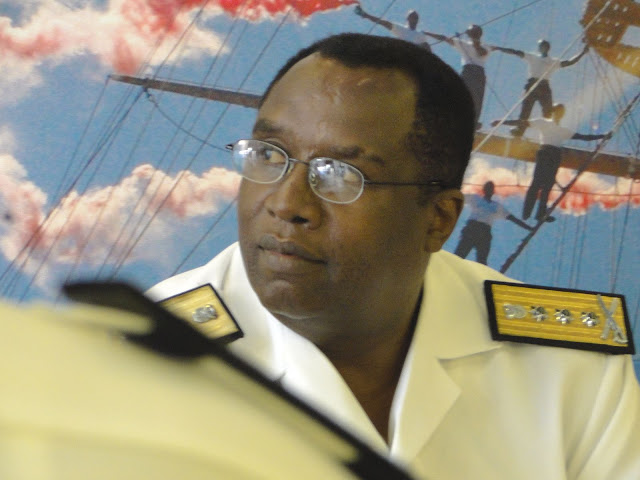
- Born: 6 March 1954 (age 72); Sophiatown, Johannesburg, South Africa
- Military career
- Allegiance: South Africa
- Branch: South African Navy
- Service years: 1998–2014
- Rank: Vice Admiral
- Commands: Chief of the South African Navy; Chief of Naval Staff; Chief Director Maritime Support; Chief of Fleet Staff; IG SA Navy
- Awards: Conspicuous Leadership Star CLS Decoration for Merit DMG Southern Cross Medal SM Merit Medal MMS Military Merit Medal MMM Merit Medal MMB Operational Medal for Southern Africa South Africa Service Medal Unitas (Unity) Medal Medalje vir Troue Diens (Medal for Loyal Service) Service Medal Order of Naval Merit Tamandaré Medal of Merit Legion of Merit LOM Legion of Honour Order of May (Naval Merit)

Vice Admiral Refiloe Mudimu CLS, DMG, SM, MMS, MMM, MMB, SAN (Rtd) is a former South African military commander, who served as the Chief of the Navy before his retirement in 2014.

== Early life ==
Johannes Mudimu was born on 6 March 1954, in Sophiatown. He became a member of the African National Congress and uMkhonto we Sizwe (MK) in 1975.

== Early career ==
Mudimu received his military training in Angola, East Germany and the then USSR. He successfully completed the commander's course in 1977. He then served as an instructor in MK camps until 1979 when he was deployed as Chief of Logistics in Luanda, Angola.

Mudimu later served in ANC Headquarters in Lusaka, Zambia as the co-ordinator of the ANC Youth Radio Programs as well as a member of the editorial board of the Youth Publications. Early in 1985, he was deployed in Harare, Zimbabwe as the ordnance operative.

Later, Mudimu was deployed as a commander of the underground units in the Transvaal and Northern Transvaal Provinces. He returned to South Africa in 1991 after the unbanning of the ANC. In 1992, he was appointed Deputy Chief of Personnel and Training and served in the MK High Command until the integration of the forces to form the South African National Defence Force in 1994.

After the integration of the forces, he was appointed to General Siphiwe Nyanda’s office as MK Chief of Staff Personnel and Training. Later he was appointed Director, Integration of the Non Statutory Forces (NSF's).

== Navy career ==
Mudimu was integrated into the South African Navy in 1998 from MK as a rear admiral (junior grade). Later, he was appointed as the Inspector General (Navy). That same year, he successfully completed the Navy Senior Command and Staff Course as well as the Senior Management Programme at the University of Stellenbosch.

On 1 April 1999, Mudimu was transferred to Simon's Town where he was appointed Chief of Fleet Staff until 30 September 2000. On 1 October 2000, he was promoted to the rank of rear admiral and appointed as Chief Director Maritime Support, a post later changed to Chief of Naval Staff. He has completed all military courses prescribed for senior officers including the Joint Staff Course 41/99.

In 2005, Mudimu was appointed Chief of the South African Navy and promoted to vice admiral.

Vice Admiral Mudimu retired on 31 March 2014.

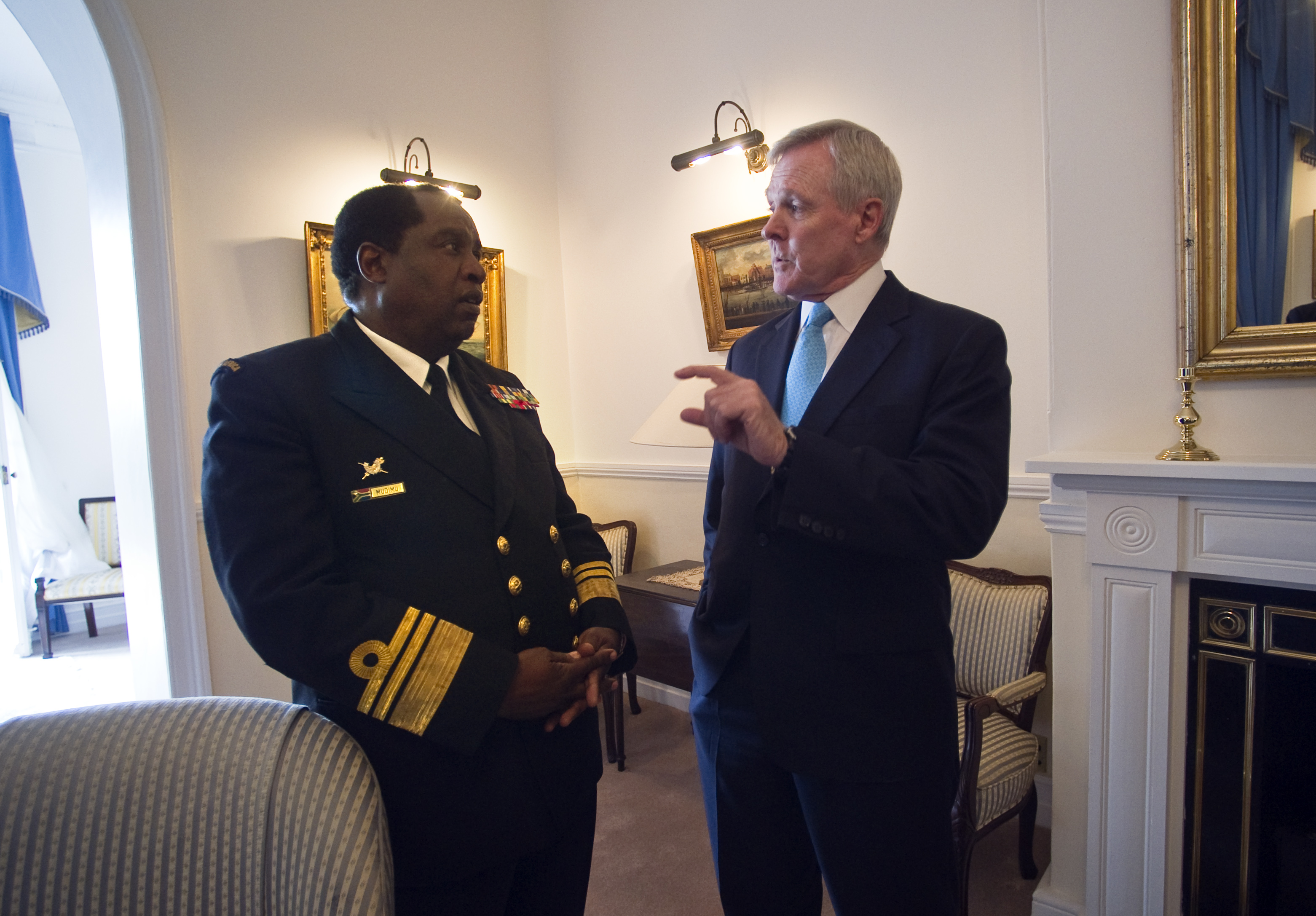
US Secretary of the Navy (SECNAV) the Honorable Ray Mabus visits with the Chief of the South African Navy Vice Adm. Johannes Mudimu

== Armscor ==
On 20 March 2014 it was announced that Vice Admiral Mudimu was due to become the next Chairman of Armscor. He resigned from Armscor in 2018 due to ill health.

== Awards and decorations ==
On 19 April 2012, Johannes Mudimu received an Honorary Doctorate from Durban University of Technology.

Internal Audit Practitioner (Qualification)
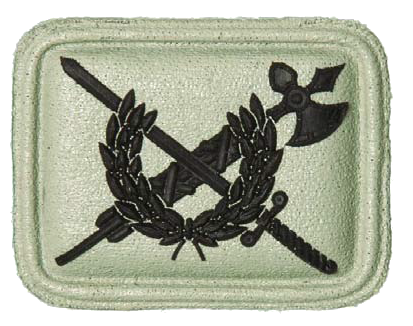
Black on Thatch beige, Embossed. Internal Audit Investigation

His list of Military awards includes:

- Conspicuous Leadership Star (CLS)
- Decoration for Merit (Gold) (DMG)
- Southern Cross Medal (1975) (SM)
- Merit Medal (Silver) (MMS)
- Military Merit Medal (MMM)
- Merit Medal (Bronze) (MMB)
- Operational Medal for Southern Africa
- South Africa Service Medal
- Unitas (Unity) Medal
- Medalje vir Troue Diens (Medal for Loyal Service) (30 Year Clasp)
- Service Medal (Silver)
- Service Medal (Bronze)
- Service Medal (Bronze)
- Order of Naval Merit (Grand Officer) (Note: Portuguese: Ordem do Mérito Naval - Grande-Oficial) (Brazil)
- Tamandaré Medal of Merit (Note: Portuguese: Medalha do Mérito Tamandaré) (Brazil)
- Legion of Merit (Commander) (LOM) (USA)
- Legion of Honour (Officer) (Note: French: Légion d'honneur - Officier) (France) (Ordre national de la Légion d'honneur)
- Order of May (Naval Merit) (Grand Cross) (Note: Spanish: Orden de Mayo (Al Mérito Naval) - Gran Cruz) (Argentina)

Military offices
Preceded by Johan Retief	Chief of the South African Navy; 2005–2014	Succeeded by Samuel Hlongwane
Preceded by Position renamed	Chief of Naval Staff; 2000–2005	Succeeded by Mosoeu Magalefa
Preceded by Martyn Trainor	Chief Director Maritime Support; 2000–2000	Succeeded by Position renamed
Post re-established	IG South African Navy; 1998–1999	Succeeded by John Barker
Business positions
Preceded by Mojo Motau	Chairman of ARMSCOR; 2014–2018	Succeeded by Thutukile Skweyiya

== See also ==
- List of South African military chiefs
- South African Navy
