= Vejaynand Ramlakan =

South African general (1957–2020)

Lieutenant General Vejaynand Indurjith Ramlakan DMG MMS MMB KStJ
- Born: September 27, 1957; Durban, Natal Province, Union of South Africa (now KwaZulu-Natal)
- Died: August 27, 2020 (aged 62); Johannesburg, Gauteng
- Military career
- Allegiance: South Africa
- Branch: South African Military Health Service
- Rank: Lieutenant General
- Nickname: Vejay
- Commands: Chief of Corporate Staff; Surgeon General; Chief Director Strategic Planning; Inspector General DoD; GOC Area Military Health Formation; Inspector General SAMHS
- Awards: Decoration for Merit DMG Merit Medal MMS Merit Medal MMB Operational Medal for Southern Africa South Africa Service Medal Unitas (Unity) Medal Mandela Commemoration Medal Medalje vir Troue Diens (Medal for Loyal Service) Service Medal Venerable Order of Saint John KStJ

Lieutenant General Vejaynand Indurjith Ramlakan DMG MMS MMB KStJ (September 28, 1957 – August 27, 2020) was a South African military commander. A medical doctor, he served in Umkhonto weSizwe (MK), the military wing of the African National Congress, during the liberation struggle against the South African government in the 1980s, and transferred to the South African National Defence Force when MK was incorporated into it in 1994.

== Early life ==
Popularly known as 'Vejay', he was born in Durban in 1957. He started schooling in Durban and matriculated at Naidoo Memorial High in Umkomaas in 1974. He obtained his basic medical degrees from the University of Natal in 1980.

== Career ==
He first joined Umkhonto we Sizwe (MK) as an underground operative in Natal in 1977. During this period, he underwent general military training in South Africa and in Swaziland. At the University of Natal, General Ramlakan served as the President of the Medical Students Representative Council from 1979 to 1980.

From 1981 until 1983, he was Vice President and General Secretary of the Natal Health Worker’s Association, and also a founding member of the United Democratic Front (UDF). As part of the command structures of MK in the then province of Natal, Lt. Gen. Ramlakan was involved in MK Operation BUTTERFLY. He also held office as a member of the first APMC inside South Africa.

His continued military and active political involvement saw him being incarcerated on Robben Island between 1987 and 1991, where he was a member of the Central Political Education Committee. General Ramlakan served as Medical Commander at the ANC National Conference in 1991 and CODESA between 1991 and 1992 before he became Medical Commander for the President Mandela Guard in 1992. Between 1993 and 1994, he served as Deputy Chief of MK Health Service and led the MK military health team for integration into the NPKF and later the South African National Defence Force (SANDF).

In the SANDF, he held the following positions:

- Director Planning of the South African Military Health Service (SAMHS) between Oct 1994 and Nov 1995;
- Inspector General of the SAMHS from Dec 1995 until Feb 2000;
- GOC Area Military Health Formation from Feb 2000 until Nov 2000;
- Inspector General DOD from Nov 2000 until Dec 2004; and
- SANDF's Chief Director Strategic Planning from Jan 2005 until he was promoted to Surgeon-General, in command of the South African Military Health Service in 2005.

On 2 October 2011, he was appointed as Chief of SANDF Corporate Staff designate and took over the post on 1 April 2013.

Following the release of the Nkandla report, newspapers speculated that he was due to go on early retirement in 2014. However, he retired quietly in May 2015.

== Death ==
Ramlakan died of natural causes on 27 August 2020 in a Johannesburg hospital.

== Awards and decorations ==
He received the following decorations:

- Decoration for Merit (Gold) (DMG)
- Merit Medal (Silver) (MMS)
- Merit Medal (Bronze) (MMB)
- Operational Medal for Southern Africa
- South Africa Service Medal
- Unitas (Unity) Medal
- Mandela Commemoration Medal (Gold)
- Medalje vir Troue Diens (Medal for Loyal Service) (30 Year Clasp)
- Service Medal (Silver)
- Service Medal (Bronze)
- Venerable Order of Saint John (Gr II - Knight of Justice or Grace) (KStJ)

== See also ==
- List of South African military chiefs
- South African Medical Service

Military offices
Preceded by Jurinus Janse van Rensburg	Chief of Corporate Staff; 2013 – 2015	Succeeded by Louis Dlulane (acting)
Preceded by Jurinus Janse van Rensburg	Surgeon General; 2005 – 2013	Succeeded by Aubrey Sedibe
Preceded by Rolf Hauter	Chief Director Strategy and Planning; Jan 2005 – Jul 2005	Unknown
Preceded by Johan Retief	IG DoD South Africa; 2000 – 2004	Succeeded by Mxolisi Petane
Preceded by H Spies	IG SAMHS; 1999 – 2000	Succeeded by PJ Oelofse
