= Godfrey Ngwenya =

South African military commander

General Godfrey Nhlanhla Ngwenya SBG DMG MMS
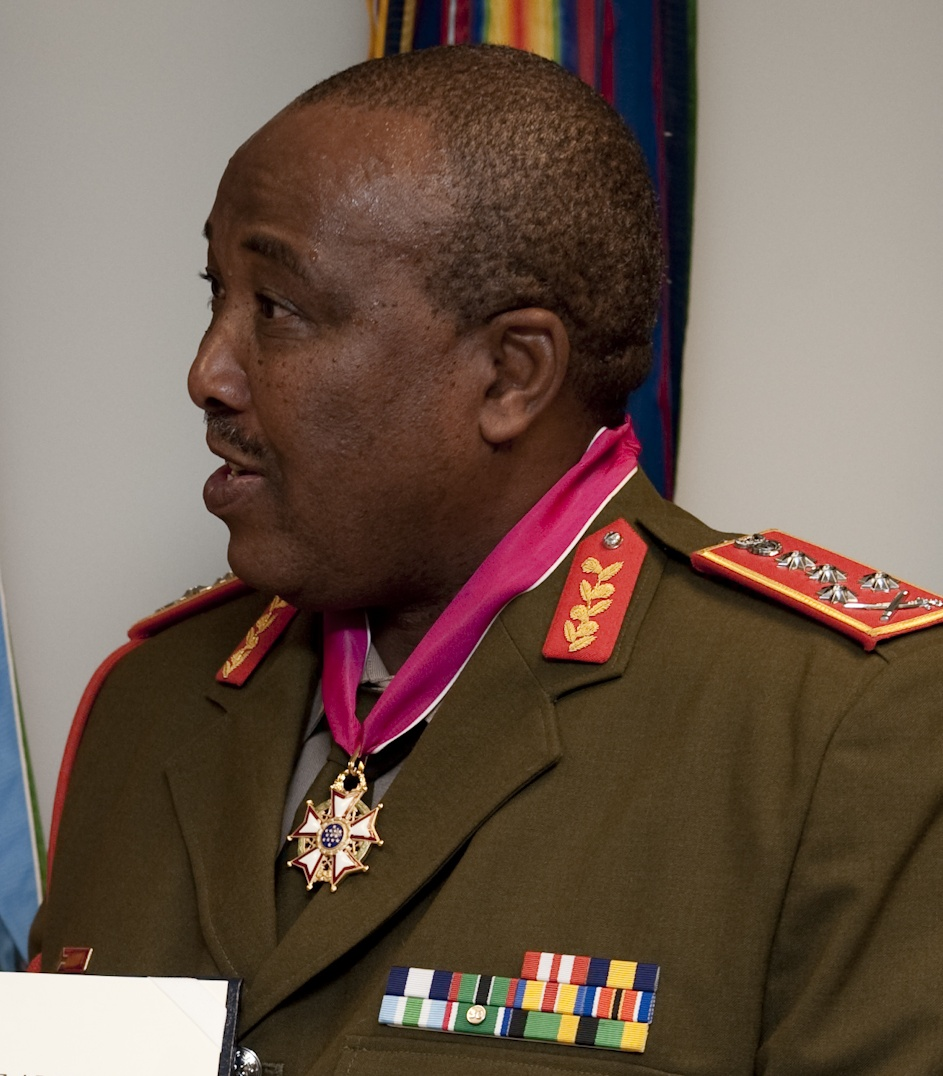
- General Godfrey Ngwenya in May 2010
- Born: 28 April 1950 (age 76); Johannesburg, South Africa
- Military career
- Allegiance: South Africa
- Branch: South African Army; Umkhonto we Sizwe
- Service years: 1994–2011
- Rank: General
- Commands: Chief of the South African National Defence Force (2005–2011); Chief of Joint Operations (2001–2005); North West Command (1996–1998)
- Awards: Star for Bravery SBG Decoration for Merit DMG Merit Medal MMS Operational Medal for Southern Africa South Africa Service Medal General Service Medal (South Africa) Unitas (Unity) Medal Tshumelo Ikatelaho (General Service Medal) Medalje vir Troue Diens (Medal for Loyal Service) Service Medal Maluti Clasp Legion of Merit LOM
- Other work: Ambassador to Angola

General Godfrey Nhlanhla Ngwenya SBG DMG MMS (born 1950) is a former South African military commander and diplomat. He served as Chief of Joint Operations from 2001 to 2005, and Chief of the South African National Defence Force from 2005 until 2011.

== Early life ==
Godfrey Ngwenya was born in Johannesburg, South Africa, on 28 April 1950. He attended Orlando High School, where he matriculated in 1970. He joined the ANC and the ANC's Military Wing, Umkhonto we Sizwe (MK), at the height of the student uprisings in South Africa in 1976. While in exile he underwent military training in Angola and passed his further commanders' courses in the then German Democratic Republic and the Soviet Union. He has been married to his spouse Busi since 1984 and has 3 children, one of which is cult figure Duma Ngwenya.

== Military career ==
Ngwenya joined Umkhonto weSizwe (MK), the military wing of the African National Congress, in 1976, and commanded MK forces in Angola from 1983 to 1989. He transferred to the South African National Defence Force when MK was incorporated into it in 1994 and he was appointed as major general and served as Deputy General Officer Commanding of Witwatersrand Command in Johannesburg from 1994 to 1996.

From 1996 to 1998, Ngwenya was General Officer Commanding of the North West Command in Potchefstroom and from 1998 to the end of September 1999 Chief Director Force Preparation in the Army Office. He served as Deputy Chief of Joint Operations from 1 October 1999 to 31 December 2000. He was promoted to the rank of lieutenant general on 1 January 2001 and appointed as Chief of Joint Operations to 2005, when he was promoted to Chief of the South African National Defence Force.

== Ambassador to Angola ==
After retirement from the army, Ngwenya was appointed Ambassador to Angola.

== Awards and decorations ==
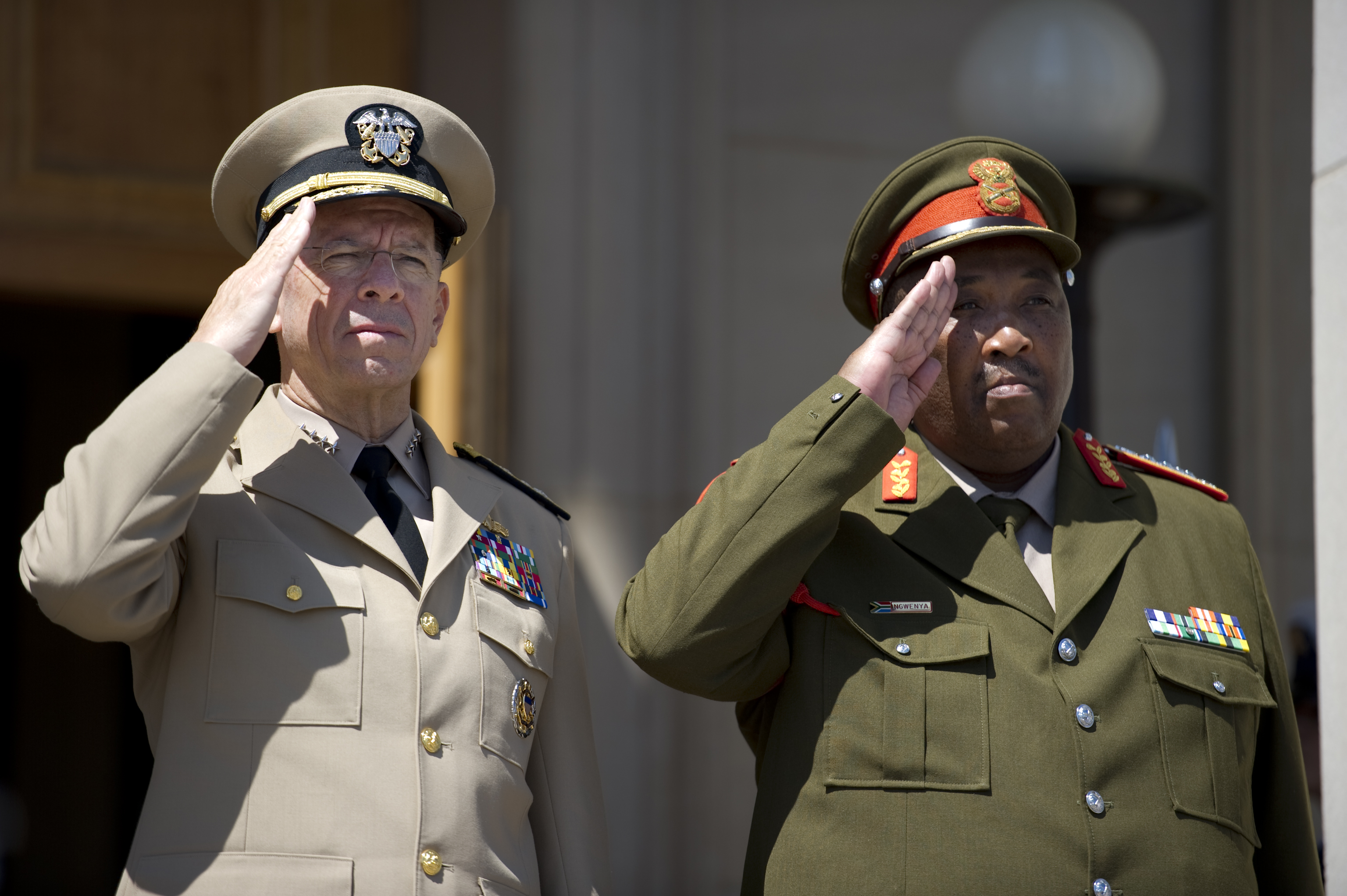
Admiral Mike Mullen, Chairman of the Joint Chiefs of Staff, and General Ngwenya, render honours during the playing of their respective national anthems at the Pentagon, 20 May 2010.

In May 2010, Ngwenya was awarded the United States Legion of Merit by then Chairman of the Joint Chiefs of Staff, Admiral Mike Mullen. The award recognised Ngwenya's leadership during a time of transition in the South African military and his country's support of vital United Nations peacekeeping operations in Sudan, Burundi and Congo.

In addition, Ngwenya has been awarded the following medals and decorations:

- Star for Bravery (Gold) (SBG)
- Decoration for Merit (Gold) (DMG)
- Merit Medal (Silver) (MMS)
- South Africa Service Medal
- Operational Medal for Southern Africa
- Tshumelo Ikatelaho (General Service Medal)
- Unitas (Unity) Medal
- Medalje vir Troue Diens (Medal for Loyal Service) (30 Year Clasp)
- Service Medal (Silver)
- Service Medal (Bronze)
- Maluti Clasp (Operation BOLEAS)
- Legion of Merit (Commander) (LOM)

Diplomatic posts
Unknown	Ambassador to Angola; 2011–	Incumbent
Military offices
Preceded by Siphiwe Nyanda	Chief of the South African National Defence Force; 2005–2011	Succeeded by Solly Shoke
Preceded by Deon Ferreira	Chief of Joint Operations Division; 2001–2005	Succeeded by Sipho Binda
Preceded by Jonny Coetzer	GOC North Western Command; 1996–1998	Succeeded by Robbie Coetsee
