= Chief C.D.F. Commendation Medal =

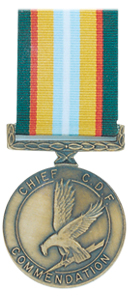
- Type: Military medal for merit
- Awarded for: Service commended by the Chief of the Ciskei Defence Force
- Country: Ciskei
- Presented by: the President
- Eligibility: All Ranks
- Status: Discontinued in 1994
- Established: 1992
- Ribbon bar

CDF pre-1994 & SANDF post-2002 orders of wear
- Next (higher): CDF precedence: Pro Merito Decoration; SANDF precedence: iPhrothiya yeBhronzi
- Next (lower): CDF succession: Ciskei Defence Medal; SANDF succession: Korea Medal

The Chief C.D.F. Commendation Medal was instituted by the President of the Republic of Ciskei in 1992, for award to all ranks for service commended by the Chief of the Ciskei Defence Force.

== The Ciskei Defence Force ==
The Ciskei Defence Force (CDF) was established upon that country's independence on 4 December 1981. The Republic of Ciskei ceased to exist on 27 April 1994 and the Ciskei Defence Force was amalgamated with six other military forces into the South African National Defence Force (SANDF).

== Institution ==
The Chief C.D.F. Commendation Medal was instituted by the President of Ciskei in 1992. It is the junior award of a set of three decorations for merit, along with the Sandile Decoration and the Sandile Medal.

Ciskei's military decorations and medals were modelled on those of the Republic of South Africa and these three decorations are the approximate equivalents of, respectively, the Southern Cross Decoration and Pro Merito Decoration, the Southern Cross Medal (1975) and Pro Merito Medal (1975), and the Military Merit Medal.

== Award criteria ==
The medal could be awarded to all ranks for service commended by the Chief of the Ciskei Defence Force.

== Order of wear ==
Since the Chief C.D.F. Commendation Medal was authorised for wear by one of the statutory forces which came to be part of the South African National Defence Force on 27 April 1994, it was accorded a position in the official South African order of precedence on that date. The position of the Chief C.D.F. Commendation Medal in the official order of precedence was revised twice after 1994, to accommodate the inclusion or institution of new decorations and medals, first in April 1996 when decorations and medals were belatedly instituted for the two former non-statutory forces, the Azanian People's Liberation Army and Umkhonto we Sizwe, and again upon the institution of a new set of honours on 27 April 2003.

Ciskei Defence Force until 26 April 1994

- Official CDF order of precedence:
  - Preceded by the Pro Merito Decoration (PMD).
  - Succeeded by the Ciskei Defence Medal.
- Ciskei official national order of precedence:
  - Preceded by the Prisons Service Commendation Medal.
  - Succeeded by the Police Medal for Maintenance of Law and Order.

South African National Defence Force from 27 April 1994

- Official SANDF order of precedence:
  - Preceded by the Transkei Defence Force Medal of the Republic of Transkei.
  - Succeeded by the Korea Medal of the Union of South Africa.
- Official national order of precedence:
  - Preceded by the Transkei Defence Force Medal of the Republic of Transkei.
  - Succeeded by the Korea Medal of the Union of South Africa.

South African National Defence Force from April 1996

- Official SANDF order of precedence:
  - Preceded by the Merit Medal in Bronze (MMB) of Umkhonto we Sizwe.
  - Succeeded by the Korea Medal of the Union of South Africa.
- Official national order of precedence:
  - Preceded by the Merit Medal in Bronze (MMB) of Umkhonto we Sizwe.
  - Succeeded by the Korea Medal of the Union of South Africa.

South African National Defence Force from 27 April 2003

- Official SANDF order of precedence:
  - Preceded by the iPhrothiya yeBhronzi (PB) of the Republic of South Africa.
  - Succeeded by the Korea Medal of the Union of South Africa.
- Official national order of precedence:
  - Preceded by the iPhrothiya yeBhronzi (PB) of the Republic of South Africa.
  - Succeeded by the Korea Medal of the Union of South Africa.

== Description ==
Obverse

The Chief C.D.F. Commendation Medal is a medallion struck in bronze, 38 millimetres in diameter, displaying the eagle emblem of the Ciskei Defence Force framed inside a double circle, which is inscribed "CHIEF C.D.F." at the top and "COMMENDATION" below.

Ribbon

The ribbon is 32 millimetres wide, with a 5 millimetres wide green band, a 2 millimetres wide red band, a 5 millimetres wide yellow band and a 3 millimetres wide light blue band, repeated in reverse order and separated by a 2 millimetres wide white band in the centre.

== Discontinuation ==
Conferment of the Chief C.D.F. Commendation Medal was discontinued when the Republic of Ciskei ceased to exist on 27 April 1994.
