= Monde Lobese =

South African navy admiral

Vice Admiral Monde Lobese MMS, MMB
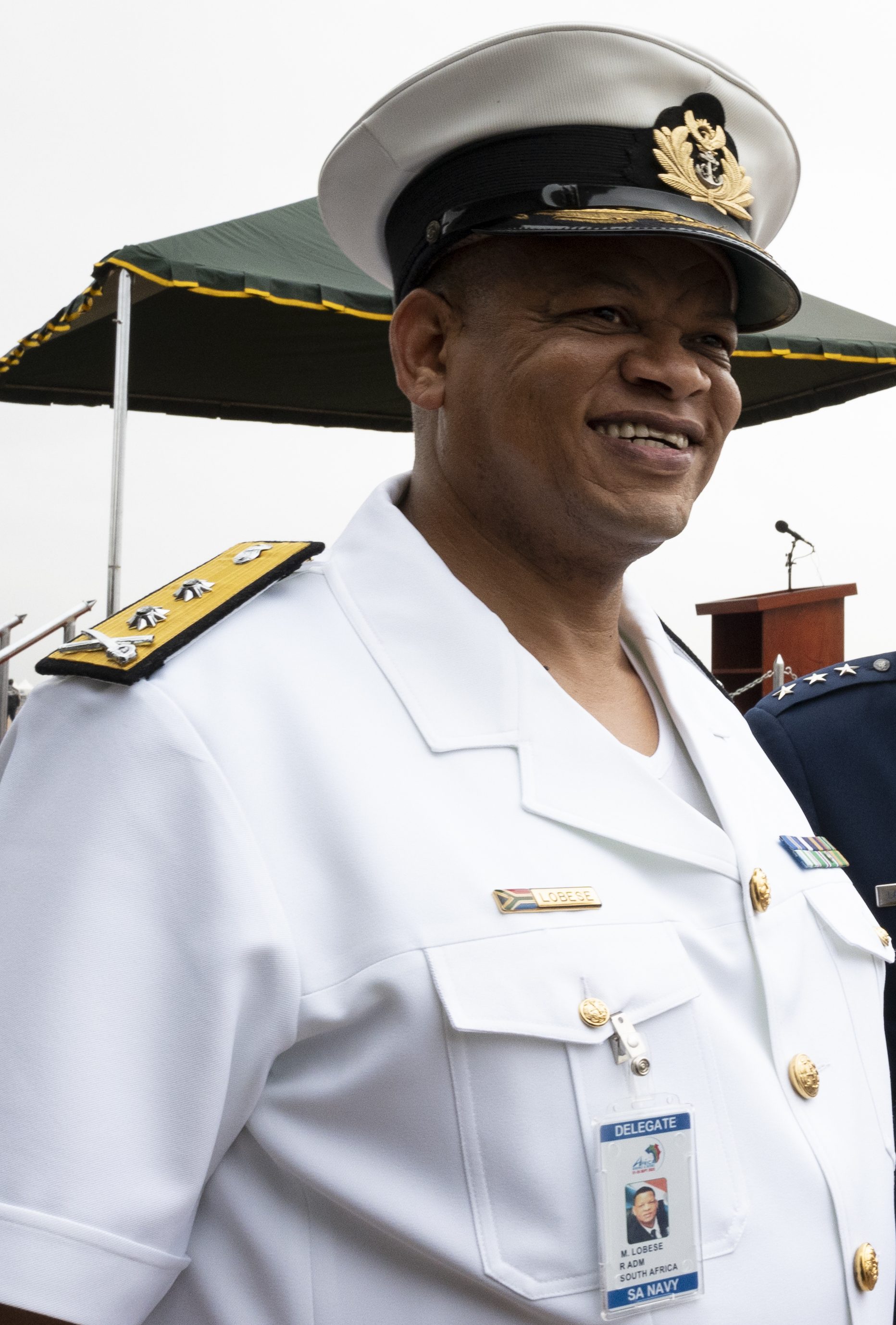
- Born: New Brighton, Eastern Cape
- Military career
- Allegiance: South Africa
- Branch: South African Navy
- Rank: Vice admiral
- Commands: Chief of the South African Navy; Deputy Chief of the South African Navy
- Awards: Merit Medal MMS Merit Medal MMB Operational Medal for Southern Africa Unitas (Unity) Medal Medalje vir Troue Diens (Medal for Loyal Service) Good Service Medal

Monde Lobese MMS MMB is a South African naval officer, serving as Chief of the South African Navy.

== Military career ==
He left South Africa in 1985 to join Umkhonto We Sizwe and underwent training in East Germany before being selected for naval training in the Soviet Union. He integrated into the South African Navy in 1994.

In 2009, he was appointed director fleet logistics at Fleet Command as a rear admiral (junior grade). In 2015 he joined Joint Operations Division as Director Operations Support where he stayed until being appointed Deputy Chief of the Navy in September 2021 and served as acting Chief after the retirement of Vice Admiral Samuel Hlongwane. He was appointed Chief of the Navy from 1 November 2022.

In November 2025 Lobese criticised the government for under-funding the South African Navy during a speech. In response, the Minister of Defence and Military Veterans Angie Motshekga issued a statement describing Lobese's speech as "inappropriate, disingenuous and unfortunate".

== Awards and decorations ==
- Merit Medal (Silver) (MMS)
- Merit Medal (Bronze) (MMB)
- Operational Medal for Southern Africa
- Unitas (Unity) Medal
- Medalje vir Troue Diens (Medal for Loyal Service) (20 Year Clasp)
- Good Service Medal (Bronze (10 Years))

Military offices
Preceded by V Adm Samuel Hlongwane	Chief of the South African Navy; 2022–	Incumbent
Preceded by R Adm Douglas Faure	Deputy Chief of the South African Navy; 2021–2022	Succeeded by R Adm Bubele Mhlana
Preceded by Brig Gen Tersia Jacobs	Director Operations Support, Joint Operations; 2015–2021	Succeeded by Brig Gen R. Gorukhnath
Preceded by Philiswa Mkayise	Director Fleet Logistics, Fleet Command; 2009–2015	Succeeded by R Adm (JG) David Mkhonto
