= Samuel Hlongwane =

South African Navy Admiral

Vice admiral Mosiwa Samuel Hlongwane MMS MMB SAN (Rtd)
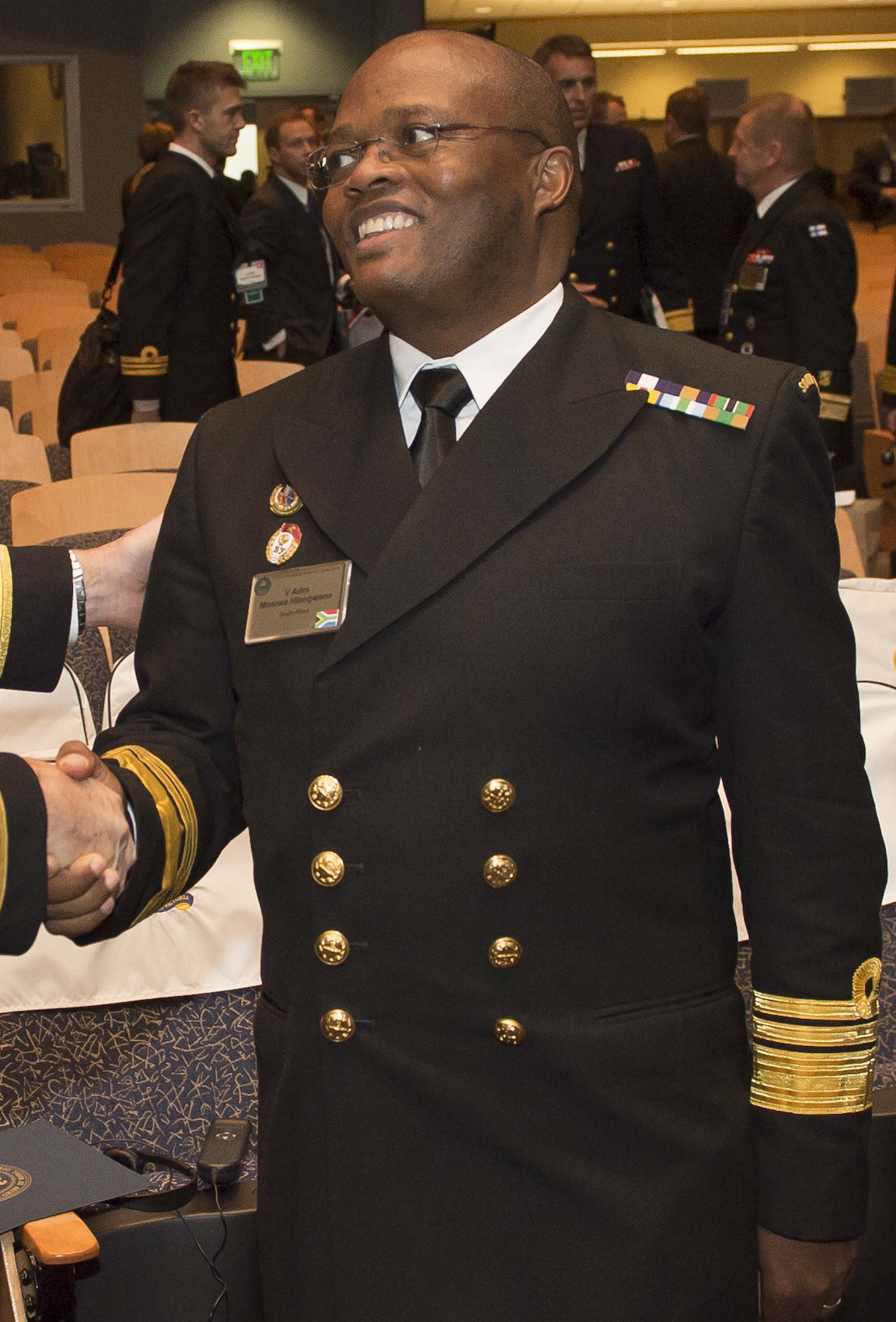
- Born: 6 July 1962 (age 64); Frankfort, South Africa
- Spouse: Thandi
- Military career
- Allegiance: South Africa
- Branch: South African Navy
- Rank: Vice admiral
- Commands: Chief of the Navy; Deputy Chief of the Navy; Chief of Fleet Staff
- Awards: Merit Medal MMS Merit Medal MMB Medalje vir Troue Diens (Medal for Loyal Service) Unitas (Unity) Medal Operational Medal for Southern Africa Mandela Commemoration Medal

Mosiwa Samuel Hlongwane MMS MMB SAN (Rtd) (born 6 July 1962) is a South African Navy officer, who served as Chief of the Navy.

== Early life and education ==
Hlongwane was born on 6 July 1962 in Frankfort, Free State (Orange Free State), but he grew up in the Vaal Triangle in a small township called Bophelong (Vanderbijlpark). He started school in 1970 at Mqiniswa Combined School (Bophelong), he completed his Junior Secondary School in 1980 at Lebohang Junior Secondary School (Boipatong) where he obtained his Junior Certificate. In 1982 he completed his matric at State Senior Secondary School (Sebokeng).

== Career ==
Hlongwane joined the African National Congress and its military wing UMkhonto we Sizwe in 1982 and was trained in Angola and the Soviet Union. In August 1986, he was selected to attend the Naval Course in the Azerbaijan SSR where he specialised in Ship Navigation Command for a period of four and half years. In November 1991, he successfully completed the Naval Ship Command Course in Navigation and he obtained a qualification of Diploma in Ship Navigation at the Caspian Naval Red Banner College of the Soviet Navy in Baku.

In 1991 he was appointed as Chief of Logistics of the two MK Camps i.e. Mgagawa and Kidete Camps in Tanzania. In 1993 - 1994 he participated in the Joint Co-ordinating Committee (JMCC) as a member of the Navy working group.

Following integration in 1994 he attended the Bridging and orientation courses at South African Naval College and Maritime Warfare School.

On 1 January 1996 he was deployed to SAS Umgeni as a learner on board the vessel. On 1 January 1997 he re-mustered to Maritime Intelligence (Counter Intelligence Section). On 1 November 1999 he was promoted to the rank of Commander and appointed as SO1 Maritime.

On 1 March 2003 he was promoted to the rank of Capt (SAN) and appointed as Senior Staff Officer Operations Counter Intelligence (SSO OPCI). On 1 March 2005 until 30 March 2008, he was appointed as the South African Defence Attaché to the Democratic Republic of Congo (DRC) & The Republic of Congo.

On 1 April 2008 he was promoted to the rank of Rear Admiral Junior Grade (JG) and appointed as Chief of Fleet Staff at the Fleet Command Headquarters in Simon's Town.

He was appointed Deputy Chief of the Navy in 2011

He retired on 30 June 2022 and was later appointed acting Director General at the Department of Military Veterans in May 2023.

== Awards ==
Adm Hlongwane has been awarded the following medals:

- Merit Medal (Silver) (MMS)
- Merit Medal (Bronze) (MMB)
- Medalje vir Troue Diens (Medal for Loyal Service) (10 Years)
- Unitas (Unity) Medal
- Operational Medal for Southern Africa
- Mandela Commemoration Medal (Gold)

Government offices
Preceded by Irene Mpolweni	Acting Director General Military Veterans Affairs; 2023–	Incumbent
Military offices
Preceded by V Adm Refiloe Johannes Mudimu	Chief of the South African Navy; 2014–2022	Succeeded by V Adm Monde Lobese
Preceded by None	Deputy Chief of the South African Navy; 2011–2014	Succeeded by R Adm Hanno Teuteberg
Preceded by R Adm (JG) Robert W. Higgs	Chief of Fleet Staff; 2008–2011	Succeeded by R Adm Hanno Teuteberg
