= Gold Decoration for Merit =

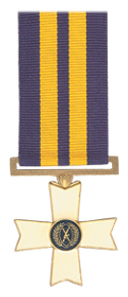
- Type: Military decoration for merit
- Awarded for: Outstanding service and utmost devotion to duty
- Country: South Africa
- Presented by: the President
- Eligibility: Azanian People's Liberation Army cadres
- Post-nominals: GDM
- Campaign: The "struggle"
- Status: Discontinued in 2003
- Established: 1996
- Ribbon bar

APLA 1996 & SANDF post-2002 orders of wear
- Next (higher): APLA precedence: Star for Conspicuous Leadership; SANDF precedence: Decoration for Merit in Gold
- Next (lower): APLA succession: Silver Medal for Merit; SANDF succession: iPhrothiya yeGolide

The Gold Decoration for Merit, post-nominal letters GDM, was instituted by the President of the Republic of South Africa in April 1996. It was awarded to veteran cadres of the Azanian People's Liberation Army, the military wing of the Pan Africanist Congress, for outstanding service and utmost devotion to duty during the "struggle".

== Azanian People's Liberation Army ==
The Azanian People's Liberation Army (APLA) was the para-military wing of the Pan Africanist Congress (PAC). It was established in 1961 to wage an armed "struggle" against the Nationalist government inside South Africa. On 27 April 1994, the Azanian People's Liberation Army was amalgamated with six other military forces into the South African National Defence Force (SANDF).

== Institution ==
The Gold Decoration for Merit, post-nominal letters GDM, was instituted by the President of South Africa in April 1996. It is the senior award of a set of three decorations for merit, along with the Silver Medal for Merit and the Bronze Medal for Merit.

The Azanian People's Liberation Army's military decorations and medals were modelled on those of the South African Defence Force and these three decorations are the approximate equivalents of, respectively, the Southern Cross Decoration and Pro Merito Decoration, the Southern Cross Medal (1975) and Pro Merito Medal (1975), and the Military Merit Medal.

== Award criteria ==
The decoration could be awarded to veteran cadres of the Azanian People's Liberation Army for outstanding service and utmost devotion to duty during the "struggle".

== Order of wear ==
The position of the Gold Decoration for Merit in the official military and national orders of precedence was revised upon the institution of a new set of honours on 27 April 2003.

Azanian People's Liberation Army

- Official APLA order of precedence:
  - Preceded by the Star for Conspicuous Leadership (SCL).
  - Succeeded by the Silver Medal for Merit (SMM).

South African National Defence Force until 26 April 2003

- Official SANDF order of precedence:
  - Preceded by the Decoration for Merit in Gold (DMG) of Umkhonto we Sizwe.
  - Succeeded by the Van Riebeeck Medal (VRM) of the Republic of South Africa.
- Official national order of precedence:
  - Preceded by the Decoration for Merit in Gold (DMG) of Umkhonto we Sizwe.
  - Succeeded by the Order of the Star of South Africa Class IV, Officer (OSSA) of the Republic of South Africa.

South African National Defence Force from 27 April 2003

- Official SANDF order of precedence:
  - Preceded by the Decoration for Merit in Gold (DMG) of Umkhonto we Sizwe.
  - Succeeded by the iPhrothiya yeGolide (PG) of the Republic of South Africa.
- Official national order of precedence:
  - Preceded by the Decoration for Merit in Gold (DMG) of Umkhonto we Sizwe.
  - Succeeded by the iPhrothiya yeGolide (PG) of the Republic of South Africa.

== Description ==
Obverse

The Gold Decoration for Merit is a silver-gilt straight armed cross with indented ends, which fits in a circle with a diameter of 38 millimetres. The arms of the cross are in white enamel, with the Azanian People's Liberation Army emblem in a dark blue enameled roundel in the centre.

Ribbon

The ribbon is 32 millimetres wide and dark blue, with two 6 millimetres wide yellow bands in the centre, spaced 4 millimetres apart.

== Discontinuation ==
Conferment of the Gold Decoration for Merit was discontinued upon the institution of a new set of honours on 27 April 2003.
