= Sipho Binda =

South African military commander

Sipho Zacchius Binda MMS
- Born: 13 July 1952
- Died: November 10, 2006 (aged 54); 1 Military Hospital, Thaba Tshwane
- Burial place: Avalon Cemetery, Soweto
- Spouse: Irene Binda
- Military career
- Allegiance: South Africa
- Branch: South African Army
- Rank: Lieutenant General
- Commands: Chief of Joint Operations; Chief of Joint Support
- Awards: Merit Medal MMS Operational Medal for Southern Africa South Africa Service Medal Unitas (Unity) Medal Service Medal

Lieutenant-General Sipho Binda MMS (13 July 1952 – 10 November 2006) was a South African military commander who served as Chief of the Joint Operations Division of the South African National Defence Force before his death on 10 November 2006.

His military career started in 1977 when he went into exile to join Umkhonto we Sizwe. He returned to South Africa and was arrested and imprisoned on Robben Island until his release in 1990.

He served as General Officer Commanding Logistics Support Formation and Force Commander for the AU mission in Burundi. He was appointed Chief of Joint Operations on 1 November 2004.

== Awards and honours ==
Gen Binda has been awarded the following:

- Merit Medal (Silver) (MMS)
- Operational Medal for Southern Africa
- South Africa Service Medal
- Unitas (Unity) Medal
- Service Medal (Silver)
- Service Medal (Bronze)

Military offices
Preceded by Godfrey Ngwenya	Chief of Joint Operations; 2005 – 2006	Vacant Title next held by Themba Matanzima in 2007
Preceded by Themba Matanzima	Chief of Joint Support; 2004 – 2005	Division disbanded
Unknown	GOC Log Supp Formation –	Succeeded by Justice Nkonyane
