= Johan Retief =

South African admiral (1946–2026)

Vice Admiral Johan Frans Retief SD & Bar PG SM MMM SAN (Rtd)
- Born: 20 March 1946; Cape Town, South Africa
- Died: 4 August 2026 (aged 80)
- Military career
- Allegiance: South Africa
- Branch: South African Navy
- Service years: 1967–2005
- Rank: Vice Admiral
- Commands: Chief of the South African Navy; Inspector General SANDF; Chief of Naval Operations; SAS Jim Fouche
- Awards: Southern Cross Decoration SD & Bar iPhrothiya yeGolide PG Southern Cross Medal SM Military Merit Medal MMM Pro Patria Medal Southern Africa Medal General Service Medal (South Africa) Unitas (Unity) Medal Medalje vir Troue Diens (Medal for Loyal Service) Good Service Medal Order of Naval Merit Order of May (Naval Merit)

Vice Admiral Johan Retief SD & Bar PG SM MMM was the Chief of the South African Navy from 2000 to 2005.

Retief was born on 20 March 1946 in Cape Town, matriculating at Hoërskool Jan van Riebeeck in Cape Town.

== Career ==
He attended the South African Military Academy after completing his Citizen Force training and graduated with a Bachelor of Military Science degree in 1967 and was judged the Best Student in that year.

He was appointed an Anti-Submarine Warfare Officer and was selected to attend the Torpedo and Anti-Submarine course at HMS Vernon in Portsmouth, United Kingdom.

He joined the Strike Craft Flotilla, initially as training officer at the inception of the project in 1975. He was the Commissioning Captain of SAS Jim Fouche and attended the Naval Command and Staff Course in 1981. After completing a year as Staff Officer Surface Warfare, he was appointed Director Naval Operations in 1985. After attending the Joint Staff Course in 1988 he served as Senior Staff Officer Research at the Intelligence Division and then as Military Secretary to the Minister of Defence General Magnus Malan and Ministers Roelf Meyer and Gene Louw.

He was promoted to rear admiral and appointed as Chief of Naval Operations with effect from 1 January 1993 until 30 April 1996, after which he served as Inspector-General of the South African National Defence Force.

He was promoted to vice admiral and appointed Chief of the South African Navy on 1 November 2000.

== Awards and decorations ==
Internal Audit Practitioner (Qualification)
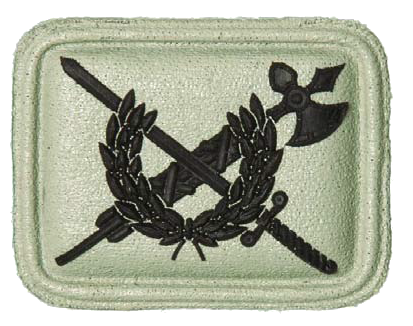
Black on Thatch beige, Embossed. Internal Audit Investigation

Adm Retief was awarded the following:

- Southern Cross Decoration (SD & Bar)
- iPhrothiya yeGolide (Golden Protea) (PG)
- Southern Cross Medal (1975) (SM)
- Military Merit Medal (MMM)
- Pro Patria Medal
- Southern Africa Medal
- General Service Medal (South Africa)
- Unitas (Unity) Medal
- Medalje vir Troue Diens (Medal for Loyal Service) (40 Year Clasp)
- Good Service Medal (Gold (30 Years))
- Good Service Medal (Silver (20 Years))
- Good Service Medal (Bronze (10 Years))
- Order of Naval Merit (Grand Officer) (Note: Portuguese: Ordem do Mérito Naval - Grande-Oficial) (Brazil)
- Order of May (Naval Merit) (Grand Cross) (Note: Spanish: Orden de Mayo (Al Mérito Naval) - Gran Cruz) (Argentina)

== See also ==
- List of South African military chiefs
- South African Navy

== Notes ==
Military offices
Preceded by Robert Simpson-Anderson	Chief of the South African Navy; 2000–2005	Succeeded by Refiloe Johannes Mudimu
New title Established at the Secretariat	Inspector General DoD; 1997–2000	Succeeded by Vejaynand Ramlakan
Preceded by Bertus Burger	Inspector General SANDF; 1996–1997	Renamed IG DoD with migration of Inspectorate to Defence Secretariat
Preceded by Paul Viljoen	Chief of Naval Operations; 1993–1996	Succeeded by Evert Groenewald
Unknown	Military Secretary to Minister of Defence; 1990–1992	Succeeded by Roelf Beukes
