= IPhrothiya yeSiliva =

South African military decoration

iPhrothiya yeSiliva Silver Protea
- Type: Military decoration for merit
- Awarded for: Outstanding leadership or outstanding meritorious service and particular devotion to duty
- Country: South Africa
- Presented by: the President
- Eligibility: All ranks
- Post-nominals: PS
- Status: Current
- Established: 27 April 2003
- Ribbon bar

Order of wear
- Next (higher): Silver Medal for Merit
- Next (lower): Danie Theron Medal

The iPhrothiya yeSiliva - Silver Protea, post-nominal letters PS, was instituted by the President of the Republic of South Africa on 16 April 2003 and came into effect on 27 April 2003. It can be awarded to all ranks who have distinguished themselves by outstanding leadership or outstanding meritorious service and particular devotion to duty. It is South Africa's second highest existing military decoration for meritorious conduct.

== The South African military ==
The Union Defence Forces (UDF) were established in 1912 and renamed the South African Defence Force (SADF) in 1958. On 27 April 1994, it was integrated with six other independent forces into the South African National Defence Force (SANDF).

== Institution ==
The iPhrothiya yeSiliva - Silver Protea, post-nominal letters PS, was instituted by the President on 16 April 2003 and came into effect on 27 April 2003, to replace the Southern Cross Medal (SM) and Pro Merito Medal (PMM). The bilingual title of the decoration is in siSwati and English.

== Award criteria ==
The decoration can be awarded to all ranks of the South African National Defence Force and of any Auxiliary Service of the SANDF, and of any Armed Forces attached to or serving with or rendering any service to the SANDF, who have distinguished themselves by outstanding leadership or outstanding meritorious service and particular devotion to duty. The decoration is the second most senior of a set of three military decorations for merit, along with the iPhrothiya yeGolide - Golden Protea and the iPhrothiya yeBhronzi - Bronze Protea.

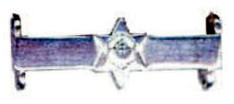
Bar to the iPhrothiya yeSiliva - Silver Protea

A bar may be awarded for every subsequent action which would make recipients eligible for the award of the same decoration. The decoration and bar may be awarded posthumously.

Guidelines consisting of appropriate phrases which may be useful when writing a citation for the award of the iPhrothiya yeSiliva - Silver Protea have been published by the South African Defence Department.

Outstanding Leadership

- More than usual.
- Aptitude, talent, ability.
- Creativity.
- Ability to persevere.

Outstanding Meritorious Service

- Positive and visible permanent results for the SANDF, at least on the level of significant benefit to the Service.
- Unusual achievement/performance.
- Particular contribution.
- Example or role model.
- Positive conduct sheet.
- Initiative.

Particular devotion to duty

- Single occasion or over a period of time.
- Special.
- Outstanding.
- Remarkable.

== Order of wear ==
The position of the iPhrothiya yeSiliva - Silver Protea in the official military and national orders of precedence is as follows:

Official military order of precedence

- Preceded by the Medal for Merit (Silver) (SSM) of the Azanian People's Liberation Army.
- Succeeded by the Danie Theron Medal (DTM) of the Republic of South Africa.

Official national order of precedence

- Preceded by the Medal for Merit (Silver) (SSM) of the Azanian People's Liberation Army.
- Succeeded by the Danie Theron Medal (DTM) of the Republic of South Africa.

== Description ==
Obverse

The iPhrothiya yeSiliva - Silver Protea is a six-pointed star, struck in silver and displaying a stylised protea, South Africa's national flower, on a blue hexagon in the centre.

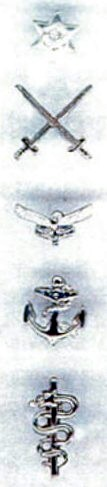
Bar button and insignia for the Army, Air Force, Navy and Military Health Service

Reverse

The reverse bears, in relief, the coat of arms of South Africa. The decoration is attached to a plain silver suspender fixed to the upper point of the star. The medal number is stamped or engraved below the coat of arms.

Ribbon

The ribbon is 32 millimetres wide and national flag blue, with a 2 millimetres wide white band, a 2 millimetres wide black band, a 2 millimetres wide gold band, a 2 millimetres wide black band and a 2 millimetres wide white band in the centre.

Bar

The bar for subsequent conferments of the iPhrothiya yeSiliva - Silver Protea is 33 millimetres wide and 5 millimetres high, struck in silver and embossed in the centre with a silhouette replica of the decoration. When only a ribbon bar is worn, a button silhouette replica of the decoration, 8 millimetres in diameter and struck in silver, is affixed to the ribbon bar.

Insignia

Award of the decoration for service in active military operations is indicated by distinguishing insignia, which indicate the arm of the service in which the recipient was serving at the time of the action for which the decoration was conferred. The insignia are struck in silver and is worn on the ribbon, above any bars which may have been awarded.

- Crossed swords for the South African Army.
- An eagle for the South African Air Force.
- An Anchor for the South African Navy.
- The Rod of Aesculapius for the South African Military Health Service.

== Recipients ==
In respect of those recipients about whom it is available, the actions they were cited for follow below the table since inclusion in the table itself is impractical.

Name	Rank	PS no.	Date of action	Unit	Service Arm
Coetzee, Renier Johannes SM MMM (Note: Battle of Bangui – Awarded for actions during the Battle of Bangui in the Central African Republic from 22 to 24 March 2013.)	Col	371	22 Mar 2013	SASFB HQ	SA Army
Mahasa, Matlole Othniel †	Sgt	353	22 Mar 2013	1 PB	SA Army
Mogorosi, Andrew Ntebaleng †	Cpl	354	22 Mar 2013	1 PB	SA Army
Seakamela, Mokgadi Darius †	Cpl	355	22 Mar 2013	1 PB	SA Army
Molora, Sello Daniel †	L Cpl	357	22 Mar 2013	1 PB	SA Army
Tsheke, Lukas Mohapi †	L Cpl	358	22 Mar 2013	1 PB	SA Army
Dlamini, Xolani †	Rfn	359	22 Mar 2013	1 PB	SA Army
Lebatlang, Lesego Maxwell Hertzog †	Rfn	360	22 Mar 2013	1 PB	SA Army
Matsheka, Karabo Edwin †	Rfn	364	22 Mar 2013	1 PB	SA Army
Msenga, Khomotso Paul †	Rfn	367	22 Mar 2013	1 PB	SA Army
Ngaleka, Vusumzi Joseph †	Rfn	368	22 Mar 2013	1 PB	SA Army
Phirimana, Thabiso Anthon †	Rfn	373	22 Mar 2013	1 PB	SA Army
Thulo, Maleisane Samuel †	Rfn	372	22 Mar 2013	1 PB	SA Army

Note 1: † denotes a posthumous award.
