= Bronze Medal for Merit =

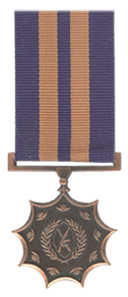
- Type: Military decoration for merit
- Awarded for: Service of a high order
- Country: South Africa
- Presented by: the President
- Eligibility: Azanian People's Liberation Army cadres
- Post-nominals: BMM
- Campaign: The "struggle"
- Status: Discontinued in 2003
- Established: 1996
- Ribbon bar

APLA 1996 & SANDF post-2002 orders of wear
- Next (higher): APLA precedence: Silver Medal for Merit; SANDF precedence: Transkei Defence Force Medal
- Next (lower): APLA succession: Operational Medal for Southern Africa; SANDF succession: Merit Medal in Bronze

The Bronze Medal for Merit, post-nominal letters BMM, was instituted by the President of the Republic of South Africa in April 1996. It was awarded to veteran cadres of the Azanian People's Liberation Army, the military wing of the Pan Africanist Congress, for service of a high order during the "struggle".

== Azanian People's Liberation Army ==
The Azanian People's Liberation Army (APLA) was the para-military wing of the Pan Africanist Congress (PAC). It was established in 1961 to wage an armed "struggle" against the Nationalist government inside South Africa. On 27 April 1994, the Azanian People's Liberation Army was amalgamated with six other military forces into the South African National Defence Force (SANDF).

== Institution ==
The Bronze Medal for Merit, post-nominal letters BMM, was instituted by the President of South Africa in April 1996. It is the junior award of a set of three decorations for merit, along with the Gold Decoration for Merit and the Silver Medal for Merit.

The Azanian People's Liberation Army's military decorations and medals were modelled on those of the South African Defence Force. These three decorations are the approximate equivalents of, respectively, the Southern Cross Decoration and Pro Merito Decoration, the Southern Cross Medal (1975) and Pro Merito Medal (1975), and the Military Merit Medal.

== Award criteria ==
The decoration could be awarded to veteran cadres of the Azanian People's Liberation Army who had rendered service of a high order during the "struggle".

== Order of wear ==
The position of the Bronze Medal for Merit in the official military and national orders of precedence was revised upon the institution of a new set of honours on 27 April 2003, but it remained unchanged.

Azanian People's Liberation Army

- Official APLA order of precedence:
  - Preceded by the Silver Medal for Merit (SMM).
  - Succeeded by the Operational Medal for Southern Africa.

South African National Defence Force until 26 April 2003

- Official SANDF order of precedence:
  - Preceded by the Transkei Defence Force Medal of the Republic of Transkei.
  - Succeeded by the Merit Medal in Bronze (MMB) of Umkhonto we Sizwe.
- Official national order of precedence:
  - Preceded by the Transkei Defence Force Medal of the Republic of Transkei.
  - Succeeded by the Merit Medal in Bronze (MMB) of Umkhonto we Sizwe.

== Description ==
Obverse

The Bronze Medal for Merit was struck in bronze and has an engrailed edge which has nine points, to fit in a circle 38 millimetres in diameter. It depicts the Azanian People's Liberation Army emblem and a protea flower in each of the nine points.

Ribbon

The ribbon is 32 millimetres wide and dark blue, with two 6 millimetres wide dark yellow bands in the centre, spaced 4 millimetres apart.

== Discontinuation ==
Conferment of the Bronze Medal for Merit was discontinued upon the institution of a new set of honours on 27 April 2003.
