= IPhrothiya yeGolide =

South African military decoration

iPhrothiya yeGolide Golden Protea
- Type: Military decoration for merit
- Awarded for: Exceptional leadership or exceptional meritorious service and the utmost devotion to duty
- Country: South Africa
- Presented by: the President
- Eligibility: All ranks
- Post-nominals: PG
- Status: Current
- Established: 27 April 2003
- Ribbon bar

Order of wear
- Next (higher): Gold Decoration for Merit
- Next (lower): Van Riebeeck Medal

The iPhrothiya yeGolide - Golden Protea, post-nominal letters PG, was instituted by the President of the Republic of South Africa on 16 April 2003 and came into effect on 27 April 2003. It can be awarded to all ranks who have distinguished themselves by exceptional leadership or exceptional meritorious service and the utmost devotion to duty. It is South Africa's highest existing military decoration for meritorious conduct.

== The South African military ==
The Union Defence Forces (UDF) were established in 1912 and renamed the South African Defence Force (SADF) in 1958. On 27 April 1994, it was integrated with six other independent forces into the South African National Defence Force (SANDF).

== Institution ==
The iPhrothiya yeGolide - Golden Protea, post-nominal letters PG, was instituted by the President on 16 April 2003 and came into effect on 27 April 2003, to replace the Southern Cross Decoration (SD) and Pro Merito Decoration (PMD). The bilingual title of the decoration is in isiZulu and English.

== Award criteria ==
The decoration can be awarded to all ranks of the South African National Defence Force and of any Auxiliary Service of the SANDF, and of any Armed Forces attached to or serving with or rendering any service to the SANDF, who have distinguished themselves by exceptional leadership or exceptional meritorious service and the utmost devotion to duty. The decoration is the senior of a set of three military decorations for merit, along with the iPhrothiya yeSiliva – Silver Protea and the iPhrothiya yeBhronzi - Bronze Protea.

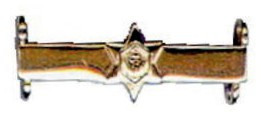
Bar to the iPhrothiya yeGolide - Golden Protea

A bar may be awarded for every subsequent action which would make recipients eligible for the award of the same decoration. The decoration and bar may be awarded posthumously.

Guidelines consisting of appropriate phrases which may be useful when writing a citation for the award of the iPhrothiya yeGolide – Golden Protea have been published by the South African Defence Department.

Exceptional Leadership

- More than usual, exceptional, unique.
- Aptitude, talent, ability, sharp-witted.
- Creativity.
- Ability to persevere.

Outstanding Service of Highest Order

- Service of vital importance/permanent significance for the SANDF.
- Outside normal routine.
- Consistent quality of work.
- Unselfishness.
- Positive effect in the organisation.
- Distinguishes him-/herself from others.
- Visible and measurable results at a national or interdepartmental level.

Outstanding Service

- Positive conduct sheet.
- Creativity.
- Innovation.
- Initiative.

== Order of wear ==
The position of the iPhrothiya yeGolide – Golden Protea in the official military and national orders of precedence is as follows:

Official military order of precedence

- Preceded by the Gold Decoration for Merit (GDM) of the Azanian People's Liberation Army.
- Succeeded by the Van Riebeeck Medal (VRM) of the Republic of South Africa.

Official national order of precedence

- Preceded by the Gold Decoration for Merit (GDM) of the Azanian People's Liberation Army.
- Succeeded by the Star of South Africa, Officer (OSSA) of the Republic of South Africa.

== Description ==
Obverse

The iPhrothiya yeGolide - Golden Protea is a six-pointed star, struck in silver-gilt and displaying a stylised protea, South Africa's national flower, on a blue hexagon in the centre.

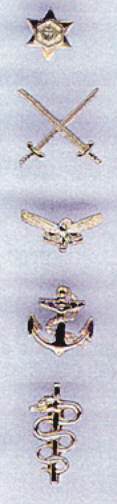
Bar button and insignia for the Army, Air Force, Navy and Military Health Service

Reverse

The reverse bears, in relief, the coat of arms of South Africa. The decoration is attached to a plain silver-gilt suspender, affixed to the upper point of the star. The medal number is stamped or engraved below the coat of arms.

Ribbon

The ribbon is 32 millimetres wide and national flag blue with, in the centre, a 2 millimetres wide gold band, a 2 millimetres wide black band and a 2 millimetres wide gold band.

Bar

The bar for subsequent conferments of the iPhrothiya yeGolide – Golden Protea is 33 millimetres in length and 5 millimetres wide, struck in silver-gilt and embossed in the centre with a silhouette replica of the decoration. When only a ribbon bar is worn, a button silhouette replica of the decoration, 8 millimetres in diameter and struck in silver-gilt, is affixed to the ribbon bar.

Insignia

Award of the decoration for service in active military operations is indicated by distinguishing insignia, which indicate the arm of the service in which the recipient was serving at the time of the action for which the decoration was conferred. The insignia are struck in silver-gilt and is worn on the ribbon, above any bars which may have been awarded.

- Crossed swords for the South African Army.
- An eagle for the South African Air Force.
- An Anchor for the South African Navy.
- The Rod of Aesculapius for the South African Military Health Service.

== Recipients ==
In respect of those recipients about whom it is available, the actions they were cited for follow below the table, since inclusion in the table itself is impractical.

Name	Rank	PG no.	Date of action	Unit	Service Arm
Dixon, William Louis (Note: Battle of Bangui – Awarded for actions during the Battle of Bangui in the Central African Republic from 22 to 24 March 2013.)	Col	0132	22 Mar 2013	Inf Fmn	SA Army
Lechoenyo, Solomon Sehularo NS MMM	Lt Col	0133	22 Mar 2013	5 SFR	SA Army

Note 1: † denotes a posthumous award.
