= IPhrothiya yeBhronzi =

South African military decoration

iPhrothiya yeBhronzi Bronze Protea
- Type: Military decoration for merit
- Awarded for: Leadership or meritorious service and devotion to duty
- Country: South Africa
- Presented by: the President
- Eligibility: All ranks
- Post-nominals: PB
- Status: Current
- Established: 27 April 2003
- Ribbon bar

Order of wear
- Next (higher): Merit Medal in Bronze
- Next (lower): Chief C.D.F. Commendation Medal

The iPhrothiya yeBhronzi - Bronze Protea, post-nominal letters PB, was instituted by the President of the Republic of South Africa on 16 April 2003 and came into effect on 27 April 2003. It can be awarded to all ranks who have distinguished themselves by leadership or meritorious service and devotion to duty.

== The South African military ==
The Union Defence Forces (UDF) were established in 1912 and renamed the South African Defence Force (SADF) in 1958. On 27 April 1994 it was integrated with six other independent forces into the South African National Defence Force (SANDF).

== Institution ==
The iPhrothiya yeBhronzi - Bronze Protea, post-nominal letters PB, was instituted by the President on 16 April 2003 and came into effect on 27 April 2003, to replace the Military Merit Medal (MMM). The bilingual title of the decoration is in isiNdebele and English.

== Award criteria ==
The decoration can be awarded to all ranks of the South African National Defence Force and of any Auxiliary Service of the SANDF, and of any Armed Forces attached to or serving with or rendering any service to the SANDF, who have distinguished themselves by leadership or meritorious service and devotion to duty. The decoration is the junior of a set of three military decorations for merit, along with the iPhrothiya yeGolide - Golden Protea and the iPhrothiya yeSiliva - Silver Protea.

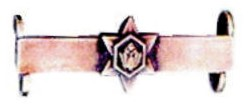
Bar to the iPhrothiya yeBhronzi - Bronze Protea

A bar may be awarded for every subsequent action which would make recipients eligible for the award of the same decoration. The decoration and bar may be awarded posthumously.

Guidelines consisting of appropriate phrases which may be useful when writing a citation for the award of the iPhrothiya yeBhronzi - Bronze Protea have been published by the South African Defence Department.

Leadership

- Quality of work.
- Unselfishness.
- Ability to organise.
- Ability to persevere.

Meritorious Service

- High quality.
- Positive attitude.
- More than normal duties.
- Results in favour of the SANDF.
- Positive conduct sheet.
- Creativity.
- Initiative.

Devotion to duty

- Loyalty.
- Conscientious/responsible.
- Punctual.

== Order of wear ==
The position of the iPhrothiya yeBhronzi - Bronze Protea in the official military and national orders of precedence is as follows:

Official military order of precedence

- Preceded by the Merit Medal in Bronze (MMB) of Umkhonto we Sizwe.
- Succeeded by the Chief C.D.F. Commendation Medal of the Republic of Ciskei.

Official national order of precedence

- Preceded by the Merit Medal in Bronze (MMB) of Umkhonto we Sizwe.
- Succeeded by the Chief C.D.F. Commendation Medal of the Republic of Ciskei.

== Description ==
Obverse

The iPhrothiya yeBhronzi - Bronze Protea is a six-pointed star, struck in bronze and displaying a stylised protea, South Africa's national flower, on a blue hexagon in the centre.

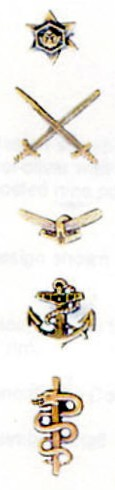
Bar button and insignia for the Army, Air Force, Navy and Military Health Service

Reverse

The reverse bears, in relief, the coat of arms of South Africa. The decoration is attached to a plain bronze suspender fixed to the upper point of the star. The decoration number is stamped or engraved below the coat of arms.

Ribbon

The ribbon is 32 millimetres wide and national flag blue, with four 2 millimetres wide white bands, separated by three 2 millimetres wide black bands, in the centre.

Bar

The bar for subsequent conferments of the iPhrothiya yeBhronzi - Bronze Protea is 33 millimetres wide and 5 millimetres high, struck in bronze and embossed in the centre with a silhouette replica of the decoration. When only a ribbon bar is worn, a button silhouette replica of the decoration, 8 millimetres in diameter and struck in bronze, is affixed to the ribbon bar.

Insignia

Award of the decoration for service in active military operations is indicated by distinguishing insignia which indicate the arm of the service in which the recipient was serving at the time of the action for which the decoration was conferred. The insignia are struck in bronze and is worn on the ribbon above any bars which may have been awarded.

- Crossed swords for the South African Army.
- An eagle for the South African Air Force.
- An Anchor for the South African Navy.
- The Rod of Aesculapius for the South African Military Health Service.
