= Korea Medal (South Africa) =

- Type: Military campaign medal
- Awarded for: Voluntary service in the Korean War
- Country: South Africa
- Presented by: the Monarch of the United Kingdom and the Commonwealth realms
- Eligibility: All Ranks
- Campaign: 1950-1953 Korean War
- Established: 1953
- Ribbon bar

SADF pre-1994 & SANDF post-2002 orders of wear
- Next (higher): SADF precedence: Military Merit Medal; SANDF precedence: Chief C.D.F. Commendation Medal
- Next (lower): SADF succession: Pro Patria Medal; SANDF succession: Pro Patria Medal
- Related: Korea Medal; Korean War Service Medal

The Korea Medal is a military campaign medal which was instituted by the Union of South Africa in 1953. It was awarded to volunteers of the Union Defence Forces for service in Korea during the 1950-1953 Korean War.

== The South African military ==
The Union Defence Forces (UDF) were established in 1912 and renamed the South African Defence Force (SADF) in 1958. On 27 April 1994, it was integrated with six other independent forces into the South African National Defence Force (SANDF).

== Korean War ==
The Flying Cheetahs, 2 Squadron of the South African Air Force, was South Africa's primary contribution to the United Nations Command during the Korean War, where it operated under American command. More than 200 officers and some 545 other ranks saw action in Korea between 1950 and 1953, along with some members from other branches of the Union Defence Forces. During the Korean War, South African pilots flew altogether 2,890 operational missions, during which 34 pilots and two ground crew were killed in action or listed as missing in action. Eight pilots were either shot down by Communist forces, or forced to land behind enemy lines and taken prisoner.

== Institution ==
The Korea Medal is a military campaign medal which was instituted by Queen Elizabeth II in 1953.

== Award criteria ==
The Korea Medal was awarded to volunteers of all ranks of the Union Defence Forces who served in the Korean theatre of operations for one day or more, between 19 September 1950 and 27 July 1953 inclusive.

== Order of wear ==
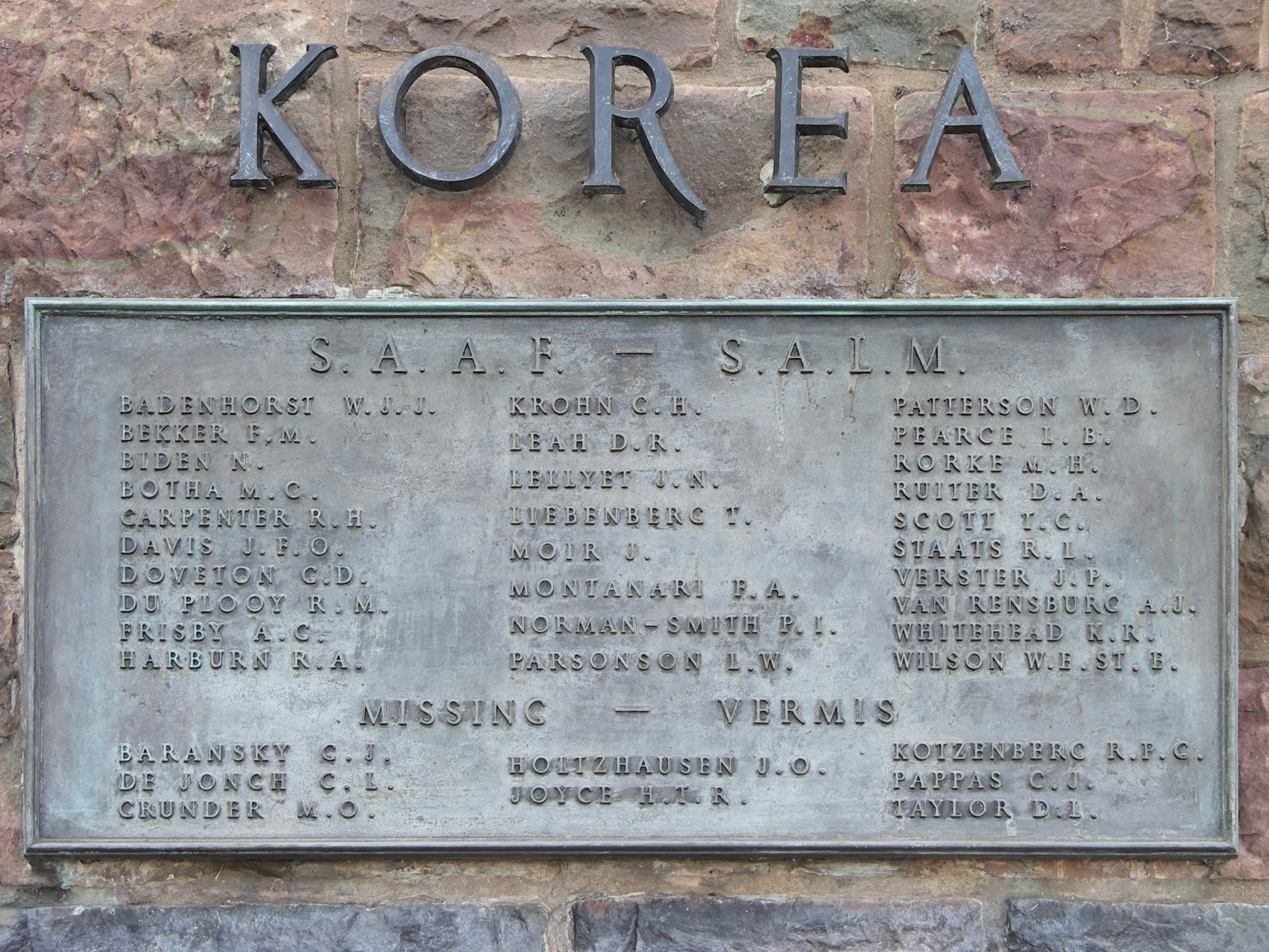
SAAF members who were killed or went missing in action in Korea

The position of the Korea Medal in the official order of precedence was revised three times after 1975, to accommodate the inclusion or institution of new decorations and medals, first upon the integration into the South African National Defence Force on 27 April 1994, again when decorations and medals were belatedly instituted in April 1996 for the two former non-statutory forces, the Azanian People's Liberation Army and Umkhonto we Sizwe, and again when a new series of military orders, decorations and medals was instituted in South Africa on 27 April 2003. Its position remained unchanged, as it was on 27 April 1994, upon the latter two occasions.

South African Defence Force until 26 April 1994

- Official SADF order of precedence:
  - Preceded by the Military Merit Medal (MMM).
  - Succeeded by the Pro Patria Medal.
- Official national order of precedence:
  - Preceded by the National Intelligence Service Decoration, Bronze.
  - Succeeded by the South African Police Medal for Combating Terrorism.

South African National Defence Force from 27 April 1994

- Official SANDF order of precedence:
  - Preceded by the Chief C.D.F. Commendation Medal of the Republic of Ciskei.
  - Succeeded by the Pro Patria Medal of the Republic of South Africa.
- Official national order of precedence:
  - Preceded by the Chief C.D.F. Commendation Medal of the Republic of Ciskei.
  - Succeeded by the Police Medal for Combating Terrorism of the Republic of South Africa.

== Description ==
Obverse

The Korea Medal was struck in silver, to fit in a circle 38 millimetres in diameter and 3 millimetres thick. Around the edge is a laurel wreath, the left branch spreading from the bottom of the medal to the top, while the right branch is shorter to allow space for the inscription "KOREA". The center has the words "VRYWILLIGERS" and "VOLUNTEERS", with outlines of the maps of the Korean Peninsula and South Africa, including South-West Africa. The maps are connected by a line with an arrowhead at each end and five wavy lines. Superimposed on the map of South Africa are the inscriptions "U. van S-A." and "U. of S.A.".

Reverse

The reverse has the pre-1994 South African coat of arms and Queen Elizabeth II's royal cipher (E II R) above the coat of arms. The medal number is impressed at the bottom of the medal on the rim.

Ribbon

The ribbon is 32 millimetres wide, with a 6 millimetres wide orange band and a 5 millimetres wide dark blue band, repeated in reverse order and separated by a 10 millimetres wide light blue band in the centre.

== Mentioned in dispatches ==
A recipient of the Korea Medal who was mentioned in dispatches during the Korean War, was entitled to wear a bronze oak leaf on the medal ribbon and ribbon bar.
