= South African Military Health Service =

- Afrikaans: Suid-Afrikaanse Militêre Gesondheidsdiens
- Emblem of SAMHS
- Active: 1979 – 1994 (as SAMS of the SADF); 1994 – present (as SAMHS of the SANDF)
- Country: South Africa
- Type: Military health service
- Size: 9,922 (Active); 1,115 (In Reserve)
- Part of: Department of Defence
- Headquarters: Pretoria, Gauteng
- Motto: Audaces Servamus

Insignia
- Identification symbol

The South African Military Health Service (SAMHS) is a branch of the South African National Defence Force, responsible for healthcare, training and deployment of medical personnel in the force.

== History ==
Flag of the Medical Service 1979-1994

The predecessor of the SAMHS, the South African Medical Service, was established as a full service branch of the South African Defence Force (SADF) on 1 July 1979 in order to consolidate and strengthen the medical services of the South African Army, South African Navy and South African Air Force.

== Rationalisation ==
Following the end of the Border War, in the early 1990s, it implemented several retrenchment measures. It consolidated all quartermaster stores in the Cape Town and Bloemfontein areas, relocated its training center from Potchefstroom to Pretoria, closed several medical supply depots, consolidated computer centers and systems, rationalized procedures for procuring medicine and medical equipment, discontinued survival training, and reduced or closed sickbays and military medical clinics that served other armed services affected by retrenchments.

The SAMS was incorporated into the South African National Defence Force on 27 April 1994, and was renamed the South African Military Health Service on 1 June 1998.

== Organisational structure ==
The SAMHS includes active duty military personnel and civilian employees of the Department of Defence. In addition, the service employs roughly 400 medical doctors and private medical specialists are sometimes appointed to supplement the staff of the SAMHS.

The Surgeon General heads the SAMHS and has the rank of Lieutenant-General. The SAMHS operates three Military Hospitals; one in Pretoria, one in Cape Town and one in Bloemfontein. There are also four specialized institutes - the Institute for Aviation Medicine, the Institute for Maritime Medicine, the Military Veterinary Institute and the Military Psychological Institute. Together, these units provide comprehensive medical care for military personnel and their dependents, as well as the police and employees of other security-related government departments, and occasionally to neighboring countries. The SAMHS also provides extensive veterinary services for animals (mainly horses and dogs) used by the security and correctional services. The Institute for Aviation Medicine and the Institute for Maritime Medicine screen pilot candidates for the air force and for civilian aviation certification, as well as divers and submariners for the navy. The military's medical services also include general medical and dental care, and specialized rehabilitation services.

The SAMHS is organized into regional medical commands, corresponding to the army's regional commands, as well as a Medical Logistics Command and a Medical Training Command. The regional commands support military units, military base hospitals, and military unit sickbays in their region. The Medical Logistics Command is responsible for medical logistics only, as each service provides for its own logistics support. In addition, the Medical Training Command supervises the South African Medical Service College, the South African Military Health Service Nursing College, and the South African Military Health Service Training Centre, as well as the military hospitals' training programs. The nursing college, in Pretoria, grants a four-year nursing diploma in association with the University of South Africa. Specialized, in-service training courses for nurses and for nursing assistants are also available.

=== Formations ===
==== Mobile Military Health Formation ====
- 1 Medical Battalion Group (Reserve)
- 3 Medical Battalion Group (Reserve)
- 6 Medical Battalion Group (Reserve)
- 7 Medical Battalion Group
- 8 Medical Battalion Group

==== Tertiary Military Health Formation ====
- 1 Military Hospital (Pretoria)
- 2 Military Hospital (Cape Town)
- 3 Military Hospital (Bloemfontein)
- Institute for Aviation Medicine (Centurion)
- Institute for Maritime Medicine (Simon's Town)
- Military Psychological Institute (Pretoria , Area Military Health Unit)
- Military Veterinary Institute (Potchefstroom)
- Military Cyber Medicine & Cyber Surgery Institute (Pretoria)

==== Area Military Health Formation ====
- Area Military Health Unit Western Cape
- Area Military Health Unit Eastern Cape
- Area Military Health Unit Northern Cape
- Area Military Health Unit North-West
- Area Military Health Unit Free State
- Area Military Health Unit KwaZulu-Natal
- Area Military Health Unit Gauteng
- Area Military Health Unit Mpumalanga
- Area Military Health Unit Limpopo
- Regional Occupational Health and Safety Centres

==== Military Health Training Formation ====
- School for Military Health Training
- School for Military Training
- SAMHS Nursing College
- SAMHS Band
- Medical Command Post Combat Training Centre (Lohatla)
- Joint Physical Training, Sports & Recreation Training Centre

==== Military Health Support Formation ====
- Military Health Base Depot
- Military Health Procurement Unit

=== General Support Base ===
- Thaba Tshwane

=== Directorates & Services ===
- Director Medicine
- Chaplain Services
- Sport & Recreation
- Corporate Communication

== Ranks and insignia ==
Officers

Rank group	General / flag officers				Senior officers			Junior officers
South African; Military Health Service
South African; Military Health Service	General	Lieutenant general	Major general	Brigadier general	Colonel	Lieutenant colonel	Major	Captain	Lieutenant	Second lieutenant

Other

Rank group	Senior NCOs				Junior NCOs		Enlisted
South African; Military Health Service							No insignia
South African; Military Health Service	Warrant officer class 1	Warrant officer class 2	Staff sergeant	Sergeant	Corporal	Lance corporal	Private (or equivalent)

=== Proficiency Insignia ===
SAMHS Proficiency Insignia
Proficiency insignia of the South African Military Health Service
Medical Doctor	Dentist	Nurse	Ops Medic
Pharmacist	Psychologist	Veterinarian	Social Work Officer
Health Inspector	Ancillary Health	Farrier	Administrative

== Leadership ==
South African Military Health Service Leadership
From	Surgeons General	To	Ribbon
27 April 1994	Lt Gen Daniel Knobel SSAS,SD,SOE,SM,MMM,KStJ,PhD	30 November 1997	Star of South Africa SSAS Southern Cross Decoration SD South African Police Star for Outstanding Service SOE Southern Cross Medal SM Military Merit Medal MMM Venerable Order of Saint John KStJ Doctor of Philosophy PhD
1 December 1997	Lt Gen Davidson Masuku SSAS,MMM,KStJ	30 September 2000	Star of South Africa SSAS Military Merit Medal MMM Venerable Order of Saint John KStJ
1 October 2000	Lt Gen Jurinus Janse van Rensburg SD,SM,MMM,KStJ	31 July 2005	Southern Cross Decoration SD Southern Cross Medal SM Military Merit Medal MMM Venerable Order of Saint John KStJ
1 August 2005	Lt Gen Vejaynand Ramlakan DMG,MMS,MMB,KStJ	31 March 2013	Decoration for Merit DMG Merit Medal MMS Merit Medal MMB Venerable Order of Saint John KStJ
1 April 2013	Lt Gen Aubrey Sedibe DMG,MMS,MMM,KStJ	31 October 2019	Decoration for Merit DMG Merit Medal MMS Military Merit Medal MMM Venerable Order of Saint John KStJ
1 November 2019	Lt Gen Zola Dabula OStJ	31 October 2021	Venerable Order of Saint John OStJ
1 November 2021	Lt Gen Ntshavheni Peter Maphaha OStJ	4 September 2026	
