= Van Riebeeck Medal =

Former South African military decoration

- Type: Military decoration for bravery
- Awarded for: Distinguished service in the field
- Country: South Africa
- Presented by: the Monarch of the United Kingdom and the Commonwealth realms and, from 1961, the State President
- Eligibility: Other Ranks
- Post-nominals: VRM
- Status: Discontinued in 1975
- Established: 1952
- First award: 1974
- Final award: 1974

Highlights
- Total: 5
- Ribbon bar

SADF pre-1994 & SANDF post-2002 orders of wear
- Next (higher): SADF precedence: Pro Merito Decoration; SANDF precedence: iPhrothiya yeGolide
- Next (lower): SADF succession: Louw Wepener Medal; SANDF succession: Louw Wepener Medal

The Van Riebeeck Medal, post-nominal letters VRM, is a military decoration for bravery which was instituted by the Union of South Africa in 1952. It was awarded to other ranks for distinguished service in the field.

== The South African military ==
The Union Defence Forces (UDF) were established in 1912 and renamed the South African Defence Force (SADF) in 1958. On 27 April 1994, it was integrated with six other independent forces into the South African National Defence Force (SANDF).

== Institution ==
The Van Riebeeck Medal, post-nominal letters VRM, was instituted by Queen Elizabeth II on 6 April 1952, during the Tercentenary Van Riebeeck Festival.

== Award criteria ==
The medal could be awarded to other ranks of the South African Defence Force for distinguished service against an enemy in the field. The medal is the other ranks' equivalent of the Van Riebeeck Decoration (DVR) for officers and is identical in design. Only five decorations were ever awarded. A silver bar was authorised to denote a second award, but was never awarded.

== Order of wear ==
With effect from 6 April 1952, when the Van Riebeeck Medal and several other new decorations and medals were instituted, these new awards took precedence before all British decorations and medals which had earlier been awarded to South Africans, with the exception of the Victoria Cross, which still took precedence before all other awards. The other older British awards continued to be worn in the order prescribed by the British Central Chancery of the Orders of Knighthood.

The position of the Van Riebeeck Medal in the official order of precedence was revised three times after 1975, to accommodate the inclusion or institution of new decorations and medals, first upon the integration into the South African National Defence Force on 27 April 1994, again in April 1996, when decorations and medals were belatedly instituted for the two former non-statutory forces, the Azanian People's Liberation Army and Umkhonto we Sizwe, and finally upon the institution of a new set of awards on 27 April 2003.

South African Defence Force until 26 April 1994

- Official SADF order of precedence:
  - Preceded by the Pro Merito Decoration (PMD).
  - Succeeded by the Louw Wepener Medal (LWM).
- Official national order of precedence:
  - Preceded by the National Intelligence Service Medal for Distinguished Service, Gold (OO).
  - Succeeded by the Louw Wepener Medal (LWM).

South African National Defence Force from 27 April 1994

- Official SANDF order of precedence:
  - Preceded by the Sandile Decoration (SD) of the Republic of Ciskei.
  - Succeeded by the Louw Wepener Medal (LWM) of the Republic of South Africa.
- Official national order of precedence:
  - Preceded by the Prisons Service Star for Distinction (PSD) of the Republic of Ciskei.
  - Succeeded by the Louw Wepener Medal (LWM) of the Republic of South Africa.

South African National Defence Force from April 1996

- Official SANDF order of precedence:
  - Preceded by the Gold Decoration for Merit (GDM) of the Azanian People's Liberation Army.
  - Succeeded by the Louw Wepener Medal (LWM) of the Republic of South Africa.
- Official national order of precedence:
  - Preceded by the Prisons Service Star for Distinction (PSD) of the Republic of Ciskei.
  - Succeeded by the Louw Wepener Medal (LWM) of the Republic of South Africa.

South African National Defence Force from 27 April 2003

- Official SANDF order of precedence:
  - Preceded by the iPhrothiya yeGolide (PG) of the Republic of South Africa.
  - Succeeded by the Louw Wepener Medal (LWM) of the Republic of South Africa.
- Official national order of precedence:
  - Preceded by the Prisons Service Star for Distinction (PSD) of the Republic of Ciskei.
  - Succeeded by the Louw Wepener Medal (LWM) of the Republic of South Africa.

== Description ==
Obverse

The Van Riebeeck Medal was struck in silver and is in the shape of the five-pointed outline of the Castle of Good Hope, to fit in a circle 38 millimetres in diameter. The suspension consists of a cluster of eight protea leaves. The statue of Jan van Riebeeck, which stands in the Heerengracht in Cape Town, is depicted in relief against a background of three rings, representing Van Riebeeck's three ships, with the outer ring inscribed "UITNEMENDE DIENS" at left and "DISTINGUISHED SERVICE" at right.

Reverse

The reverse has the pre-1994 South African Coat of Arms. Specimens which were struck before 31 May 1961, had Queen Elizabeth II's royal cipher (E II R) above the coat of arms. The royal cypher was removed when these medals were first awarded in 1974, but a ghost image is still visible on some, such as on the reverse of the miniature medal depicted.

Ribbon

The ribbon is 32 millimetres wide and sky blue, with a 6 millimetres wide white band in the centre.

Bar

Bar button

A silver bar was authorised to denote a second award of the Van Riebeeck Medal, but was never awarded. The bar displayed an embossed field cannon in its centre. When ribbons alone are worn, a button displaying a field cannon would have been worn on the ribbon bar.

== Discontinuation ==
The Van Riebeeck Medal was discontinued in July 1975, when the military decorations and medals of the Republic were revised and some of the 1952 series of decorations and medals were replaced with new awards.

== Recipients ==
The Van Riebeeck Medal was only awarded to five individuals, all to Navy and Special Forces personnel for an operation in Tanzania in 1974.

VRM no.	Name	Rank	Service	Unit	Date	Action cited for
	Brewin, K.A.	WO1	SA Navy	SAS EH	2 Aug 1974	Special Forces operation in Tanzania
	Floyd, T.I.	WO2	SA Army	1 RR	2 Aug 1974	Special Forces operation in Tanzania
	Conradie, J.L. ♠	S Sgt	SA Army	1 RR	2 Aug 1974	Special Forces operation in Tanzania
	Moorcroft, J.J. ♥	S Sgt	SA Army	1 RR	2 Aug 1974	Special Forces operation in Tanzania
	De Beer D.L.	Sgt	SA Army	1 RR	6 Dec 1974	

Note 1: ♠ Conradie was also awarded the HC in 1975.
Note 2: ♥ On 1 November 1993, WO1 J.J. Moorcroft PMD VRM PMM MMM was appointed Sergeant Major of the Army, a post he held until 30 May 2001.
