= Silver medal =

Medal awarded for achieving second place

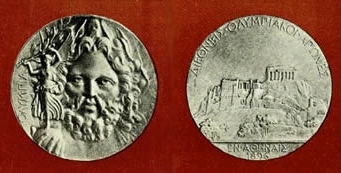
The 1896 Olympic silver medal

A silver medal, in sports and other similar areas involving competition, is a medal made of, or plated with, silver awarded to the second-place finisher, or runner-up, of contests or competitions such as the Olympic Games, Commonwealth Games, etc. The outright winner receives a gold medal and the third place a bronze medal. More generally, silver is traditionally a metal sometimes used for all types of high-quality medals, including artistic ones.

== Sports ==
=== Olympic Games ===
During the first Olympic event in 1896, number one achievers or winners' medals were in fact made of silver metal. The custom of gold-silver-bronze for the first three places dates from the 1904 games and has been copied for many other sporting events. Minting the medals is the responsibility of the host city. From 1928 to 1968 the design was always the same: the obverse showed a generic design by Florentine artist Giuseppe Cassioli with text giving the host city; the reverse showed another generic design of an Olympic champion. From 1972–2000, Cassioli's design (or a slight reworking) remained on the obverse with a custom design by the host city on the reverse. Noting that Cassioli's design showed a Roman amphitheatre for what was originally a Greek games, a new obverse design was commissioned for the Athens Games. Winter Olympics medals have been of more varied design.

=== The Open Championship ===
In The Open Championship golf tournament, the Silver Medal is an award presented to the lowest scoring amateur player at the tournament.

=== Rejection of silver medals ===
In many sports with an elimination tournament, including those with a third place playoff (such as Olympic ice hockey, Olympic soccer, FIFA World Cup), silver is the only medal given to a team that loses its final game, whereas gold and bronze are earned by teams winning their final matches. Notable athletes such as Jocelyne Larocque (2018 Olympics) removed their runners-up/silver medals right after receiving them; Larocque was later ordered by the International Ice Hockey Federation official to put her silver medal back on.

== Military and government ==
Some countries present military and civilian decorations known as Silver Medals. These include:

- Austria′s Silver Medal for Services to the Republic of Austria
- Italy′s Silver Medal of Military Valor
- South Africa′s Silver Medal for Merit
- The Civil Air Patrol′s Silver Medal of Valor in the United States.

== Other awards ==
The Zoological Society of London awards a Silver Medal "to a Fellow of the Society or any other person for contributions to the understanding and appreciation of zoology, including such activities as public education in natural history, and wildlife conservation."

The Royal Academy of Engineering awards a Silver Medal "for an outstanding and demonstrated personal contribution to UK engineering, which results in successful market exploitation, by an engineer with less than 22 years in full-time employment or equivalent."

== See also ==
- Runner-up
