= Silver Medal for Merit =

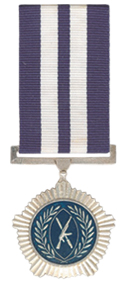
- Type: Military decoration for merit
- Awarded for: Exceptionally meritorious service and particular devotion to duty
- Country: South Africa
- Presented by: the President
- Eligibility: Azanian People's Liberation Army cadres
- Post-nominals: SMM
- Campaign: The "struggle"
- Status: Discontinued in 2003
- Established: 1996
- Ribbon bar

APLA 1996 & SANDF post-2002 orders of wear
- Next (higher): APLA precedence: Gold Decoration for Merit; SANDF precedence: Merit Medal in Silver
- Next (lower): APLA succession: Bronze Medal for Merit; SANDF succession: iPhrothiya yeSiliva

The Silver Medal for Merit, post-nominal letters SMM, was instituted by the President of the Republic of South Africa in April 1996. It was awarded to veteran cadres of the Azanian People's Liberation Army, the military wing of the Pan Africanist Congress, for exceptionally meritorious service and particular devotion to duty during the "struggle".

== Azanian People's Liberation Army ==
The Azanian People's Liberation Army (APLA) was the para-military wing of the Pan Africanist Congress (PAC). It was established in 1961 to wage an armed "struggle" against the Nationalist government inside South Africa. On 27 April 1994, the Azanian People's Liberation Army was amalgamated with six other military forces into the South African National Defence Force (SANDF).

== Institution ==
The Silver Medal for Merit, post-nominal letters SMM, was instituted by the President in April 1996. It is the middle award of a set of three decorations for merit, along with the Gold Decoration for Merit and the Bronze Medal for Merit.

The Azanian People's Liberation Army's military decorations and medals were modelled on those of the South African Defence Force and these three decorations are the approximate equivalents of, respectively, the Southern Cross Decoration and Pro Merito Decoration, the Southern Cross Medal (1975) and Pro Merito Medal (1975), and the Military Merit Medal.

== Award criteria ==
The decoration could be awarded to veteran cadres of the Azanian People's Liberation Army for exceptionally meritorious service and particular devotion to duty during the "struggle".

== Order of wear ==
The position of the Silver Medal for Merit in the official military and national orders of precedence was revised upon the institution of a new set of honours on 27 April 2003.

Azanian People's Liberation Army

- Official APLA order of precedence:
  - Preceded by the Gold Decoration for Merit (GDM).
  - Succeeded by the Bronze Medal for Merit (BMM).

South African National Defence Force until 26 April 2003

- Official SANDF order of precedence:
  - Preceded by the Merit Medal in Silver (MMS) of Umkhonto we Sizwe.
  - Succeeded by the Danie Theron Medal (DTM) of the Republic of South Africa.
- Official national order of precedence:
  - Preceded by the Merit Medal in Silver (MMS) of Umkhonto we Sizwe.
  - Succeeded by the Correctional Services Medal for Merit, Non-Commissioned Officers of the Republic of South Africa.

South African National Defence Force from 27 April 2003

- Official SANDF order of precedence:
  - Preceded by the Merit Medal in Silver (MMS) of Umkhonto we Sizwe.
  - Succeeded by the iPhrothiya yeSiliva (PS) of the Republic of South Africa.
- Official national order of precedence:
  - Preceded by the Merit Medal in Silver (MMS) of Umkhonto we Sizwe.
  - Succeeded by the iPhrothiya yeSiliva (PS) of the Republic of South Africa.

== Description ==
Obverse

The Silver Medal for Merit was struck in silver, to fit in a circle 38 millimetres in diameter. It depicts the Azanian People's Liberation Army emblem in a dark blue enameled roundel, in the centre of a five-pointed starburst of radiating points.

Reverse

The reverse displays the embellished pre-1994 South African Coat of Arms.

Ribbon

The ribbon is 32 millimetres wide and dark blue, with two 6 millimetres wide white bands in the centre, spaced 4 millimetres apart.

== Discontinuation ==
Conferment of the Silver Medal for Merit was discontinued upon the institution of a new set of South African honours on 27 April 2003.
