= Clarence Makwetu =

South African anti-apartheid activist and politician (1928 – 2016)

Clarence Mlami Makwetu
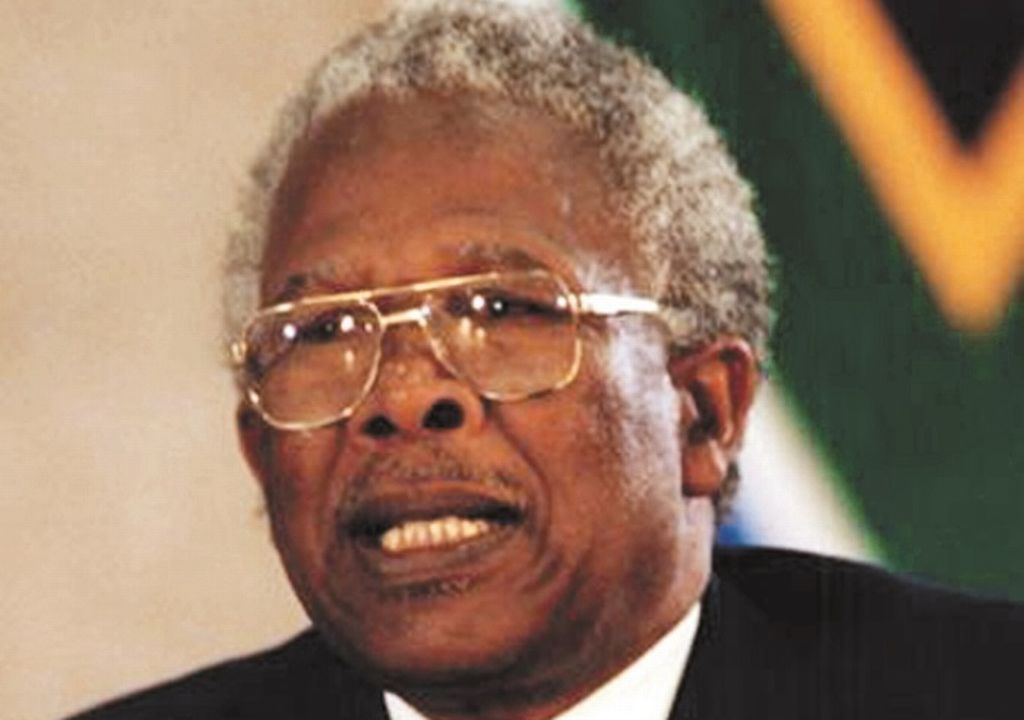

Personal details
- Born: 6 December 1928 Cofimvaba, Transkei, South Africa
- Died: 1 April 2016 (aged 87)
- Party: African National Congress (1954–1959); Pan Africanist Congress (1959–1997)
- Profession: Activist, politician

Clarence Mlami Makwetu (6 December 1928 – 1 April 2016) was a South African anti-apartheid activist, politician, and leader of the Pan Africanist Congress of Azania (PAC) during the historic 1994 elections.

== Personal life ==
Clarence Mlami Makwetu was born on 6 December 1928 in Hoyita, Cofimvaba in the bantustan of Transkei. He was the second of five children of Minah and Gqongo Makwetu. He was educated at Keilands Mission School in the Stutterheim district and matriculated at Lovedale, near Alice in the Eastern Cape. Makwetu left the Transkei for Cape Town where African were not allowed after a brief stint in Port Elizabeth as a casual worker in the late 1940s. In Cape Town he was received by Chris Hani’s elder brother, with whom he was friends. He had a stint in a factory that made children’s toys, but left work after intermittent pass raids by the police. Makwetu soon became self-employed and sold various goods from his flat in Langa before he became involved in the struggle for liberation in 1952.

== Anti-apartheid activity ==
Clarence Makwetu became involved in the struggle for liberation when he joined the 1952 Defiance campaign, an anti-apartheid pass laws campaign organised by the African National Congress. In 1954, he had joined the ANC Youth League as a member. Disillusioned by the ANC's approach to the fight for liberation, Makwetu joined the Africanist faction led Robert Sobukwe. This faction believed in the saying Africa for Africa which meant that Africans had to determine their future. On 6 April 1959, Makwetu and other Africanists such as Potlako Leballo formed the Pan Africanist Congress under the leadership of Robert Sobukwe at Orlando Community Hall in Soweto. One of Makwetu's main reasons for supporting the PAC was its commitment to restoring the land to the African people. Makwetu became the PAC secretary at Langa Flats. While Sobukwe led thousands of people against pass laws in Sharpville on 21 March 1960, Makwetu was one of the 6000 men who had gathered to march to the Langa police station for the same cause on the same day. On 30 March 1960, a state of the emergency was declared and Makwetu was detained from March until September 1960.During this period the PAC was banned.

In August 1961 he was arrested in Cape Town and escorted to Transkei where he was banished. A month later he was again detained from September 1961 to February 1962. After his release, he returned to Cape Town, but was arrested again and sent back to Cofimvaba. In April 1963, Makwetu was once again arrested and charged with furthering the aims of a banned organisation, the PAC. He was tried in Ngcobo and sentenced to Five years imprisonment. On his way to Robben Island he was taken to Stellenbosch to face further charges but was acquitted. During his time in Robben Island, he became a companion of former South African president Nelson Mandela with whom he was in the B section on the prison After serving five years, Makwetu was released from Robben Island in 1968 and taken back to Transkei where he was restricted for two years until 1970. He soon found employment near Qamata, Transkei as a clerk with a building firm earning R39 a month. He obtained a plot of land linked to an irrigation scheme and began crop farming. In June 1976 during the Soweto uprisings, he was detained and held until May 1977 for alleged underground activities. He was also arrested by the Transkei Police in July 1979 and detained until October of the same year. In December 1979, Kaiser Daliwonga Matanzima, finally banished him to the Libode district for 5 years until October 1984 when he was allowed to return to Cofimvaba. But his presence remained a threat and he was detained again in August 1986 for 4 months. In 1989 the Pan African Movement (PAM) was launched and Makwetu was elected leader. In 1990, the PAC was unbanned and Makwetu was elected president in December that year.

== Political career ==
In April 1992, Makwetu declared at his political party's Annual Congress that the PAC was now not opposed to taking part in the negotiations to end the apartheid, so long the negotiations were held in a "neutral venue under a neutral chairman." The PAC unsuccessfully argued during the Codesa negotiations that any settlement that did not tackle the land question was flawed, and this failure lead the party to be divided over whether to participate in the 1994 elections. Makwetu argued for participation, and ordered the party's military wing, the Azanian People's Liberation Army (Apla), to end its armed struggle, but with the party not fully behind the campaign, the party only won five seats in the historic first non-racial election. In 1994, he became one of the PAC's three MPs in South Africa's first democratic Parliament.

Makwetu was unseated as leader in 1996, being accused of bringing the party into disrepute, and retired. Following his expulsion from the PAC in 1997, Makwetu went on to form and lead the Pan Africanist Movement (PAM). Makwetu's nephew, Mazwi, said his uncle resorted to land activism in his home town of Cofimvaba in the former Transkei where he had a farm, livestock and several fields.

== Awards ==
In 2004, Makwetu was awarded the Order of Luthuli in Silver by President Thabo Mbeki for his contribution to the struggle for a non-racial‚ non-sexist‚ just and democratic South Africa.

== Death and legacy ==
Makwetu died on 1 April 2016 at the age of 88 and was buried on 16 April 2016. Makwetu is survived by his wife Mandisa and two sons.

ANC stalwart Ahmed Kathrada is quoted saying about Makwetu. "In the political circles, Makwetu is remembered for his discipline. He was widely respected across the political divide because of his discipline. He was one man I could talk politics to without the fear of being insulted...He came after us in jail (Robben Island) and we were all stunned by his conduct. He always preached unity, which was contrary to what the other PAC guys wanted.”
