= Zola Dabula =

South African military officer (1956–2023)

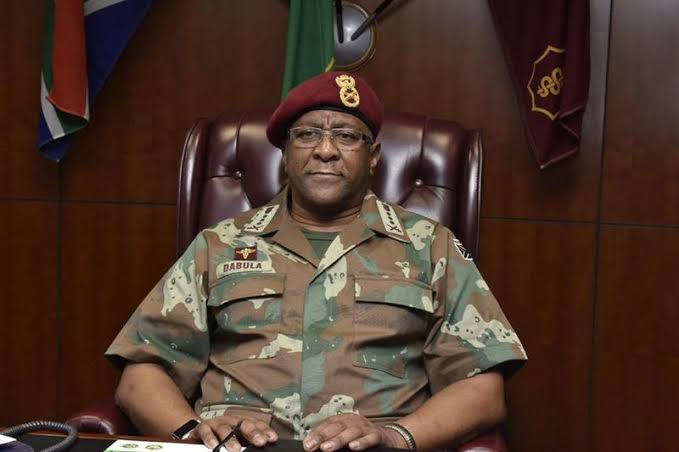
- Born: Zola Wiseman Songo Dabula; 20 October 1956; Eastern Cape, Transkei (now South Africa)
- Died: 4 June 2023 (aged 66)
- Education: University of Natal
- Military career
- Allegiance: South Africa
- Branch: South African Military Health Service
- Rank: Lieutenant General
- Commands: South African Military Health Service

Lieutenant General Zola Wiseman Songo Dabula (20 October 1956 – 4 June 2023) was a South African military officer, who served as the Surgeon General of the South African Military Health Service.

== Early life ==
Zola Wiseman Songo Dabula was born in the former homeland of the Transkei in 1956. Having graduated from the University of Natal medical school, at the time reserved for black students, he returned to Umtata where he became involved in underground ANC structures. This led to his arrest, during which he shared a cell with an American priest Fr. Casimir Paulsen, both enduring torture at the hands of the apartheid regime.

== Military career ==
With the dawn of democracy in South Africa Dabula integrated into the newly formed South African National Defence Force where he served in various roles, ultimately being appointed Surgeon General in 2019.

As executive head of the SANDF Presidential Medical Unit, Dr. Dabula oversaw the healthcare of President Nelson Mandela.

== Controversy ==
Lieutenant General Dabula was summoned to parliament to explain his role in the illegal importation by the South African Department of Defence of the Cuban produced drug interferon, which was being considered as a potential prophylactic against COVID-19.

== Death ==
Dabula died on 4 June 2023, at the age of 66.

Military offices
Preceded by Aubrey Sedibe	Chief of the South African Military Health Service; 2019–2021	Succeeded by Ntshavheni Peter Maphaha
