= 1 Military Hospital =

Military hospital in Pretoria, South Africa

- Part of Thaba Tshwane
- Pretoria, South Africa

Location
- Coordinates: 25°46′43″S 28°09′36″E

Site history
- In use: 1972 - current

1 Military Hospital is a large medical facility in Pretoria that provides treatment for members of the South African National Defence Force (SANDF).

== History ==
The hospital opened in 1972. It was the most sophisticated hospital available for South African Defence Force (SADF) personnel and also provided care for highly ranked politicians from South Africa and other countries. It included emergency and trauma units, twelve operating theatres, intensive care units and a wide range of other facilities, including specialist areas to treat combat casualties.

During the Apartheid period large numbers of homosexual conscripts were mistreated at 1 Military Hospital. These men were subjected to brutal forms of behaviour therapy and some were forced to undergo narcoanalysis or chemical castration. It has been alleged that approximately 900 homosexual servicemen and servicewomen were put through gender reassignment surgery at 1 Military Hospital between 1967 and 1987 without informed consent or adequate standards of care. Some died during surgery and the survivors were given new identities and told to break off contact with their friends and family.

In late 2012 former president Nelson Mandela was treated at the hospital for a lung infection.

A project to refurbish the hospital, which had not been updated since it opened, began in 1999 but was abandoned following delays and allegations of financial irregularities. A new refurbishment project was subsequently launched in 2006. In 2026 it was reported that this project had failed despite the expenditure of R1 billion due to mismanagement and corruption and 1 Military Hospital was unable to provide important health services to service personnel and veterans. The hospital was reported only capable of operating at 40 percent of capacity and many medical services had been outsourced to other medical facilities. This had led to delays in the provision of healthcare and disruptions to the training of members of the South African Military Health Service.

In June 2026 the Department of Defence and Military Veterans informed a parliamentary inquiry that the government was considering ending the refurbishment project and building a new hospital. Members of parliament from the Democratic Alliance and Economic Freedom Fighters were highly critical of the government's handling of the refurbishment project and called for investigations into the alleged corruption.
