= Decoration for Merit in Gold =

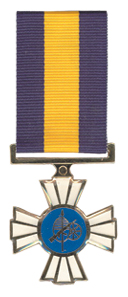
- Type: Military decoration for merit
- Awarded for: Outstanding service and utmost devotion to duty
- Country: South Africa
- Presented by: the President
- Eligibility: uMkhonto we Sizwe cadres
- Post-nominals: DMG
- Campaign: The "struggle"
- Status: Discontinued in 2003
- Established: 1996
- Ribbon bar

MK 1996 & SANDF post-2002 orders of wear
- Next (higher): MK precedence: Conspicuous Leadership Star; SANDF precedence: Sandile Decoration
- Next (lower): MK succession: Merit Medal in Silver; SANDF succession: Gold Decoration for Merit

The Decoration for Merit in Gold, post-nominal letters DMG, was instituted by the President of the Republic of South Africa in April 1996. It was awarded to veteran cadres of uMkhonto we Sizwe, the military wing of the African National Congress, who had distinguished themselves during the "struggle" by outstanding service and utmost devotion to duty.

== uMkhonto we Sizwe ==
uMkhonto we Sizwe, abbreviated as MK, Zulu for "Spear of the Nation", was the paramilitary wing of the African National Congress (ANC). It was established on 16 December 1961 to wage an armed "struggle" against the Nationalist government inside South Africa. On 27 April 1994, Umkhonto we Sizwe was amalgamated with six other military forces into the South African National Defence Force (SANDF).

== Institution ==
The Decoration for Merit in Gold, post-nominal letters DMG, was instituted by the President of South Africa in April 1996. It is the senior award of a set of three decorations for merit, along with the Merit Medal in Silver and the Merit Medal in Bronze.

uMkhonto we Sizwe's military decorations and medals were modeled on those of the South African Defence Force and these three decorations are the approximate equivalents of, respectively, the Southern Cross Decoration and Pro Merito Decoration, the Southern Cross Medal (1975) and Pro Merito Medal (1975), and the Military Merit Medal.

== Award criteria ==
The decoration could be awarded to veteran cadres of uMkhonto we Sizwe who had distinguished themselves during the "struggle" by outstanding service and utmost devotion to duty.

== Order of wear ==
The position of the Decoration for Merit in Gold in the official military and national orders of precedence was revised upon the institution of a new set of honours on 27 April 2003, but it remained unchanged.

uMkhonto we Sizwe

- Official MK order of precedence:
  - Preceded by the Conspicuous Leadership Star (CLS).
  - Succeeded by the Merit Medal in Silver (MMS).

South African National Defence Force until 26 April 2003

- Official SANDF order of precedence:
  - Preceded by the Sandile Decoration (SD) of the Republic of Ciskei.
  - Succeeded by the Gold Decoration for Merit (GDM) of the Azanian People's Liberation Army.
- Official national order of precedence:
  - Preceded by the Police Star for Distinguished Service of the Lebowa Homeland.
  - Succeeded by the Gold Decoration for Merit (GDM) of the Azanian People's Liberation Army.

== Description ==
Obverse

The Decoration for Merit in Gold is a silver-gilt double Maltese cross, which fits in a circle 45 millimetres in diameter. The arms of the cross are in white enamel, with the Umkhonto we Sizwe emblem in a dark blue enameled roundel in the centre.

Ribbon

The ribbon is 32 millimetres wide and dark blue, with a 12 millimetres wide yellow band in the centre.

== Discontinuation ==
Conferment of the Decoration for Merit in Gold was discontinued upon the institution of a new set of honours for the South African National Defence Force on 27 April 2003.
