= Merit Medal in Bronze =

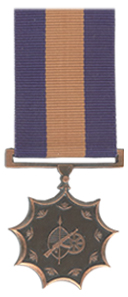
- Type: Military decoration for merit
- Awarded for: Service of a high order
- Country: South Africa
- Presented by: the President
- Eligibility: uMkhonto we Sizwe cadres
- Post-nominals: MMB
- Campaign: The "struggle"
- Status: Discontinued in 2003
- Established: 1996
- Ribbon bar

MK 1996 & SANDF post-2002 orders of wear
- Next (higher): MK precedence: Merit Medal in Silver; SANDF precedence: Bronze Medal for Merit
- Next (lower): MK succession: Operational Medal for Southern Africa; SANDF succession: iPhrothiya yeBhronzi

The Merit Medal in Bronze, post-nominal letters MMB, was instituted by the President of the Republic of South Africa in April 1996. It was awarded to veteran cadres of uMkhonto we Sizwe, the military wing of the African National Congress, who had distinguished themselves during the "struggle" by service of a high order.

== uMkhonto we Sizwe ==
uMkhonto we Sizwe, abbreviated as MK, "Spear of the Nation" in Zulu, was the paramilitary wing of the African National Congress (ANC). It was established on 16 December 1961 to wage an armed "struggle" against the Nationalist government inside South Africa. On 27 April 1994, Umkhonto we Sizwe was amalgamated with six other military forces into the South African National Defence Force (SANDF).

== Institution ==
The Merit Medal in Bronze, post-nominal letters MMB, was instituted by the President of South Africa in April 1996. It is the junior award of a set of three decorations for merit, along with the Decoration for Merit in Gold and the Merit Medal in Silver.

uMkhonto we Sizwe's military decorations and medals were modelled on those of the South African Defence Force and these three decorations are the approximate equivalents of, respectively, the Southern Cross Decoration and Pro Merito Decoration, the Southern Cross Medal (1975) and Pro Merito Medal (1975), and the Military Merit Medal.

== Award criteria ==
The decoration could be awarded to veteran cadres of uMkhonto we Sizwe who had distinguished themselves during the "struggle" by service of a high order.

== Order of wear ==
The position of the Merit Medal in Bronze in the official military and national orders of precedence was revised upon the institution of a new set of honours on 27 April 2003.

uMkhonto we Sizwe

- Official MK order of precedence:
  - Preceded by the Merit Medal in Silver (MMS).
  - Succeeded by the Operational Medal for Southern Africa.

South African National Defence Force until 26 April 2003

- Official SANDF order of precedence:
  - Preceded by the Bronze Medal for Merit (BMM) of the Azanian People's Liberation Army.
  - Succeeded by the Chief C.D.F. Commendation Medal of the Republic of Ciskei.
- Official national order of precedence:
  - Preceded by the Bronze Medal for Merit (BMM) of the Azanian People's Liberation Army.
  - Succeeded by the Chief C.D.F. Commendation Medal of the Republic of Ciskei.

South African National Defence Force from 27 April 2003

- Official SANDF order of precedence:
  - Preceded by the Bronze Medal for Merit (BMM) of the Azanian People's Liberation Army.
  - Succeeded by the iPhrothiya yeBhronzi (PB) of the Republic of South Africa.
- Official national order of precedence:
  - Preceded by the Bronze Medal for Merit (BMM) of the Azanian People's Liberation Army.
  - Succeeded by the iPhrothiya yeBhronzi (PB) of the Republic of South Africa.

== Description ==
Obverse

The Merit Medal in Bronze was struck in bronze and has an engrailed edge which has nine points, to fit in a circle 38 millimetres in diameter. It depicts the Umkhonto we Sizwe emblem and a protea flower in each of the nine points.

Ribbon

The ribbon is 32 millimetres wide and dark blue, with a 12 millimetres wide dark yellow band in the centre.

== Discontinuation ==
Conferment of the Merit Medal in Bronze was discontinued upon the institution of a new set of honours on 27 April 2003.
