= Merit Medal in Silver =

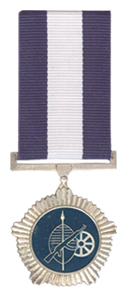
- Type: Military decoration for merit
- Awarded for: Exceptionally meritorious service and particular devotion to duty
- Country: South Africa
- Presented by: the President
- Eligibility: Umkhonto we Sizwe cadres
- Post-nominals: MMS
- Campaign: The "struggle"
- Status: Discontinued in 2003
- Established: 1996
- Ribbon bar

MK 1996 & SANDF post-2002 orders of wear
- Next (higher): MK precedence: Decoration for Merit in Gold; SANDF precedence: Marumo Medal, Class I
- Next (lower): MK succession: Merit Medal in Bronze; SANDF succession: Silver Medal for Merit

The Merit Medal in Silver, post-nominal letters MMS, was instituted by the President of the Republic of South Africa in April 1996. It was awarded to veteran cadres of Umkhonto we Sizwe, the military wing of the African National Congress, who had distinguished themselves during the "struggle" by exceptionally meritorious service and particular devotion to duty.

== uMkhonto we Sizwe ==
uMkhonto we Sizwe, abbreviated as MK, "Spear of the Nation" in isiZulu, was the paramilitary wing of the African National Congress (ANC). It was established on 16 December 1961, to wage an armed "struggle" against the Nationalist government inside South Africa. On 27 April 1994, Umkhonto we Sizwe was amalgamated with six other military forces into the South African National Defence Force (SANDF).

== Institution ==
The Merit Medal in Silver, post-nominal letters MMS, was instituted by the President in April 1996. It is the middle award of a set of three decorations for merit, along with the Decoration for Merit in Gold and the Merit Medal in Bronze.

Umkhonto we Sizwe's military decorations and medals were modelled on those of the South African Defence Force and these three decorations are the approximate equivalents of, respectively, the Southern Cross Decoration and Pro Merito Decoration, the Southern Cross Medal (1975) and Pro Merito Medal (1975), and the Military Merit Medal.

== Award criteria ==
The decoration could be awarded to veteran cadres of Umkhonto we Sizwe who had distinguished themselves during the "struggle" by exceptionally meritorious service and particular devotion to duty.

== Order of wear ==
The position of the Merit Medal in Silver in the official military and national orders of precedence was revised upon the institution of a new set of honours on 27 April 2003, but it remained unchanged.

Umkhonto we Sizwe

- Official MK order of precedence:
  - Preceded by the Decoration for Merit in Gold (DMG).
  - Succeeded by the Merit Medal in Bronze (MMB).

South African National Defence Force until 26 April 2003

- Official SANDF order of precedence:
  - Preceded by the Marumo Medal, Class I of the Republic of Bophuthatswana.
  - Succeeded by the Silver Medal for Merit (SMM) of the Azanian People's Liberation Army.
- Official national order of precedence:
  - Preceded by the Medal of the Order of the Leopard of the Republic of Bophuthatswana.
  - Succeeded by the Silver Medal for Merit (SMM) of the Azanian People's Liberation Army.

== Description ==
Obverse

The Merit Medal in Silver was struck in silver, to fit in a circle 38 millimetres in diameter. It depicts the Umkhonto we Sizwe emblem in a dark blue enameled roundel, in the centre of a five-pointed starburst of radiating points.

Reverse

The reverse displays the embellished pre-1994 South African Coat of Arms.

Ribbon

The ribbon is 32 millimetres wide and dark blue, with a 12 millimetres wide white band in the centre.

== Discontinuation ==
Conferment of the Merit Medal in Silver was discontinued upon the institution of a new set of honours on 27 April 2003.
