= Operational Medal for Southern Africa =

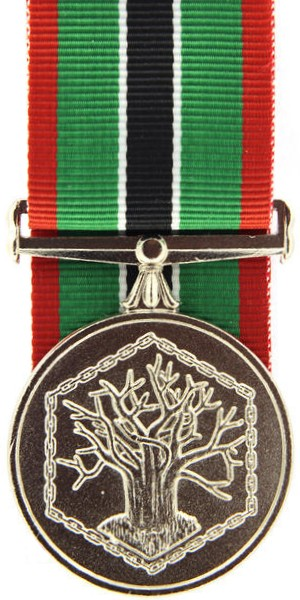
- Type: Military campaign medal
- Awarded for: Operational service outside South Africa
- Country: South Africa
- Presented by: the President
- Eligibility: Umkhonto we Sizwe and Azanian People's Liberation Army cadres
- Campaign: The "struggle"
- Status: Discontinued in 2003
- Established: 1998
- Ribbon bar

APLA and MK 1996 & SANDF post-2002 orders of wear
- Next (higher): MK precedence: Merit Medal in Bronze; APLA precedence: Bronze Medal for Merit; SANDF precedence: General Service Medal
- Next (lower): MK and APLA succession: South Africa Service Medal; SANDF succession: South Africa Service Medal

The Operational Medal for Southern Africa was instituted by the President of the Republic of South Africa in 1998. It was awarded to veteran cadres of Umkhonto we Sizwe and the Azanian People's Liberation Army for operational service outside South Africa during the "struggle".

== MK and APLA ==
Umkhonto we Sizwe, abbreviated as MK, "Spear of the Nation" in Zulu, was the para-military wing of the African National Congress (ANC), while the Azanian People's Liberation Army (APLA) was the para-military wing of the Pan Africanist Congress. Both were established in 1961 to wage an armed "struggle" against the Nationalist government inside South Africa. On 27 April 1994, Umkhonto we Sizwe and the Azanian People's Liberation Army were amalgamated with five statutory defence forces into the South African National Defence Force (SANDF).

== Institution ==
The Operational Medal for Southern Africa was instituted by the President of South Africa in 1998.

== Award criteria ==
The medal could be awarded to veteran cadres of Umkhonto we Sizwe and the Azanian People's Liberation Army for operational service outside South Africa during the "struggle".

== Order of wear ==
The position of the Operational Medal for Southern Africa in the official military and national orders of precedence was revised upon the institution of a new set of honours on 27 April 2003, but it remained unchanged.

Umkhonto we Sizwe

- Official MK order of precedence:
  - Preceded by the Merit Medal in Bronze (MMB).
  - Succeeded by the South Africa Service Medal.

Azanian People's Liberation Army

- Official APLA order of precedence:
  - Preceded by the Bronze Medal for Merit (BMM).
  - Succeeded by the South Africa Service Medal.

South African National Defence Force until 26 April 2003

- Official SANDF order of precedence:
  - Preceded by the General Service Medal of the Republic of Bophuthatswana.
  - Succeeded by the South Africa Service Medal of Umkhonto we Sizwe and the Azanian People's Liberation Army.
- Official national order of precedence:
  - Preceded by the General Service Medal of the Republic of Bophuthatswana.
  - Succeeded by the South Africa Service Medal of Umkhonto we Sizwe and the Azanian People's Liberation Army.

== Description ==
Obverse

The Operational Medal for Southern Africa is a medallion struck in nickel-silver, 38 millimetres in diameter with a raised rim, and depicts a baobab tree inside a hexagonal frame of chain.

Reverse

The reverse has a wide raised rim and displays the embellished pre-1994 South African Coat of Arms.

Ribbon

The ribbon is 32 millimetres wide, with a 4 millimetres wide red band, an 8 millimetres wide green band and a 1 millimetre wide white band, repeated in reverse order and separated by a 6 millimetres wide black band in the centre.

== Discontinuation ==
Conferment of the Operational Medal for Southern Africa was discontinued upon the institution of a new set of honours on 27 April 2003.
