= Pro Merito Decoration =

Former South African military decoration

- Type: Military decoration for merit
- Awarded for: Outstanding service of the highest order and utmost devotion to duty
- Country: South Africa
- Presented by: the State President and, from 1994, the President
- Eligibility: Other ranks
- Post-nominals: PMD
- Status: Discontinued in 2003
- Established: 1975
- First award: 1976
- Ribbon bar

SADF pre-1994 & SANDF post-2002 orders of wear
- Next (higher): SADF precedence: Southern Cross Decoration; SANDF precedence: Southern Cross Decoration
- Next (lower): SADF succession: Van Riebeeck Medal; SANDF succession: Conspicuous Leadership Star

The Pro Merito Decoration, post-nominal letters PMD, is a military decoration for merit which was instituted by the Republic of South Africa on 1 July 1975. It was awarded to other ranks of the South African Defence Force for outstanding service of the highest order and utmost devotion to duty.

== The South African military ==
The Union Defence Forces (UDF) were established in 1912 and renamed the South African Defence Force (SADF) in 1958. On 27 April 1994, it was integrated with six other independent forces into the South African National Defence Force (SANDF).

== Institution ==
The Pro Merito Decoration, post-nominal letters PMD, was instituted by the State President on 1 July 1975.

== Award criteria ==
The decoration could be awarded to other ranks of the South African Defence Force for outstanding service of the highest order and utmost devotion to duty. A Bar was instituted in 1993, to be awarded in recognition of further similar displays of outstanding service of the highest order and utmost devotion to duty. The equivalent award for officers was the Southern Cross Decoration (SD).

Although not prescribed, the practice was generally that the recipient must already have received the Pro Merito Medal (PMM).

== Order of wear ==
The position of the Pro Merito Decoration in the official order of precedence was revised three times after 1975 to accommodate the inclusion or institution of new decorations and medals, first upon the integration into the South African National Defence Force on 27 April 1994, again in April 1996, when decorations and medals were belatedly instituted for the two former non-statutory forces, the Azanian People's Liberation Army and Umkhonto we Sizwe, and finally upon the institution of a new set of awards on 27 April 2003.

South African Defence Force until 26 April 1994

- Official SADF order of precedence:
  - Preceded by the Southern Cross Decoration (SD).
  - Succeeded by the Van Riebeeck Medal (VRM).
- Official national order of precedence:
  - Preceded by the Southern Cross Decoration (SD).
  - Succeeded by the Police Star for Distinguished Service (SOO).

South African National Defence Force from 27 April 1994

- Official SANDF order of precedence:
  - Preceded by the Southern Cross Decoration (SD) of the Republic of South Africa.
  - Succeeded by the Defence Force Merit Decoration of the Republic of Bophuthatswana.
- Official national order of precedence:
  - Preceded by the Southern Cross Decoration (SD) of the Republic of South Africa.
  - Succeeded by the Police Star for Distinguished Service (SOO) of the Republic of South Africa.

South African National Defence Force from April 1996

- Official SANDF order of precedence:
  - Preceded by the Southern Cross Decoration (SD) of the Republic of South Africa.
  - Succeeded by the Conspicuous Leadership Star (CLS) of Umkhonto we Sizwe.
- Official national order of precedence:
  - Preceded by the Southern Cross Decoration (SD) of the Republic of South Africa.
  - Succeeded by the Conspicuous Leadership Star (CLS) of Umkhonto we Sizwe.

The position of the Pro Merito Decoration in the order of precedence remained unchanged, as it was in April 1996, when a new series of military orders, decorations and medals was instituted on 27 April 2003.

== Description ==
Obverse

The Pro Merito Decoration is a silver-gilt Maltese cross, which fits in a circle 45 millimetres in diameter. The arms of the cross are in white enamel, with a disa uniflora, in red enamel, on a framed roundel in dark blue enamel in the centre. A protea attaches the decoration to the ribbon suspender.

Reverse

The reverse has the pre-1994 South African Coat of Arms in the centre, with the silver hallmark below it and the decoration number impressed on the bottom arm of the cross.

Pro Merito Decoration and Bar

Bar

The Bar is silver-gilt and has an emblem, depicting a Protea, embossed in the centre. The same bar was used to indicate multiple awards of the Pro Virtute Decoration, Southern Cross Decoration, Pro Merito Decoration and Ad Astra Decoration.

Ribbon

The ribbon is 32 millimetres wide and dark blue, with a 4 millimetres wide white band in the centre.

== Discontinuation ==
Conferment of the decoration was discontinued in respect of services performed on or after 27 April 2003, when the Southern Cross Decoration and the Pro Merito Decoration were both replaced by the new iPhrothiya yeGolide.
