= Southern Cross Decoration =

Former South African military decoration

- Type: Military decoration for merit
- Awarded for: Outstanding service of the highest order and utmost devotion to duty
- Country: South Africa
- Presented by: the State President and, from 1994, the President
- Eligibility: Officers
- Post-nominals: SD
- Status: Discontinued in 2003
- Established: 1975
- First award: 1976
- Ribbon bar

SADF pre-1994 & SANDF post-2002 orders of wear
- Next (higher): SADF precedence: Pro Virtute Decoration; SANDF precedence: Pro Virtute Decoration
- Next (lower): SADF succession: Pro Merito Decoration; SANDF succession: Pro Merito Decoration

The Southern Cross Decoration, post-nominal letters SD, is a South African military decoration for merit which was instituted by the Republic on 1 July 1975. It was awarded to officers of the South African Defence Force for outstanding service of the highest order and utmost devotion to duty.

== The South African military ==
The Union Defence Forces (UDF) were established in 1912 and renamed the South African Defence Force (SADF) in 1958. On 27 April 1994, it was integrated with six other independent forces into the South African National Defence Force (SANDF).

== Institution ==
The Southern Cross Decoration, post-nominal letters SD, was instituted by the State President on 1 July 1975.

== Award criteria ==
The decoration could be awarded to officers of the South African Defence Force for outstanding service of the highest order and utmost devotion to duty. A Bar was instituted in 1993, to be awarded in recognition of further similar displays of outstanding service of the highest order and utmost devotion to duty. The equivalent award for other ranks was the Pro Merito Decoration (PMD).

Although not prescribed, the practice was generally that recipients must already have received the Southern Cross Medal (SM).

The first recipient was Admiral Hugo Biermann SSA OBE GCIH, who received the decoration upon his retirement as Chief of the South African Defence Force in 1976.

== Order of wear ==
The position of the Southern Cross Decoration in the official order of precedence was revised three times, to accommodate the inclusion or institution of new decorations and medals, first upon the integration into the South African National Defence Force in 1994, again when decorations and medals were belatedly instituted in April 1996 for the two former non-statutory forces, the Azanian People's Liberation Army and Umkhonto we Sizwe, and again upon the institution of a new set of awards in 2003, but it remained unchanged on all three occasions.

Official SANDF order of precedence

- Preceded by the Pro Virtute Decoration (PVD).
- Succeeded by the Pro Merito Decoration (PMD).

Official national order of precedence

- Preceded by the Pro Virtute Decoration (PVD).
- Succeeded by the Pro Merito Decoration (PMD).

== Description ==
Obverse

The Southern Cross Decoration is a silver-gilt double Maltese cross, which fits in a circle 45 millimetres in diameter. The arms of the cross are in white enamel, with the stars of the Southern Cross on a framed roundel, in dark blue enamel, in the centre. A protea attaches the decoration to the ribbon hanger.

Reverse

The reverse has the pre-1994 South African Coat of Arms in the centre, with the decoration number impressed above and the silver hallmark below.

Southern Cross Decoration and Bar

Bar

The Bar is silver-gilt and has an emblem, depicting a Protea, embossed in the centre. The same Bar was used to indicate multiple awards of the Pro Virtute Decoration, Southern Cross Decoration, Pro Merito Decoration and Ad Astra Decoration.

Ribbon

The ribbon is 32 millimetres wide and dark blue, with two 1 millimetre wide white bands in the centre, 4 millimetres apart.

== Discontinuation ==
Conferment of the decoration was discontinued in respect of services performed on or after 27 April 2003, when the Southern Cross Decoration and the Pro Merito Decoration (PMD) were both replaced by the new iPhrothiya yeGolide (PG).
