= Azanian People's Liberation Army =

Paramilitary wing of the Pan Africanist Congress from 1961 to 1994

- Leaders: Potlako Leballo, Vusumzi Make, Jafta Masemola, Zephania Mothopeng, Letlapa Mphahlele, John Nyathi Pokela, Sabelo Phama, Jan Shoba
- Dates active: 11 September 1961 – June 1994
- Active regions: South Africa
- Ideology: Black Nationalism; Pan-Africanism; African socialism
- Status: Inactive
- Part of: Pan Africanist Congress

The Azanian People's Liberation Army (APLA), formerly known as Poqo, was the paramilitary wing of the Pan Africanist Congress, an African nationalist movement in South Africa. In the Xhosa language, the word 'Poqo' means 'pure'.

After the murder of several white families the APLA was subsequently classified as a terrorist organisation by the South African National government and the United States.

APLA was disbanded and integrated into the South African National Defence Force (SANDF) in June 1994.

== Etymology ==
In 1968 the "Azanian People's Liberation Army" (or APLA) replaced the defunct name "Poqo", which means pure in Xhosa, a local South African language, as the armed wing of the PAC. Its new name was derived from Azania, the ancient Greek name for Southern Africa.

The name Azania has been applied to various parts of southeastern tropical Africa. In the Roman period and perhaps earlier, the toponym referred to a portion of the Southeast African coast extending from Kenya, to perhaps as far south as Tanzania.

== History ==
=== Formation and early resistance ===
Poqo was founded in 1961 following the massacre of PAC-led protestors at the hands of police outside the Sharpeville police station the previous year. Potlako Leballo, the chairman of the PAC at the time of the formation of its military wing in the 1960s, modelled APLA on the Chinese People's Liberation Army, with Templeton Ntantala as his deputy.

Members of Poqo targeted the town of Paarl in the Western Cape on 22 November 1962, when a crowd of over 200 people armed with axes, pangas and other home-made weapons marched from the Mbekweni township into Paarl and attacked the police station, homes and shops. Two white residents, Frans Richard and Rencia Vermeulen were killed. This attack was followed by the murder of a family camping at Bashee River in the Transkei on 4 February 1963. Norman and Elizabeth Grobbelaar, their teenage daughters Edna and Dawn, together with Mr Derek Thompson, were hacked to death in their caravans.

Leballo had planned a massive revolt for 8 April 1963, but Basotholand police managed to track down and raid the PAC's headquarters, seizing a complete list of Poqo members. In the following government crackdown, nearly 2000 Poqo members were sent to prison, almost wiping out the entire organization. Consequently, Poqo ceased to be an important participant in the anti-Apartheid struggle during the remainder of the 1960s.

In 1968, the Poqo was renamed APLA and unsuccessfully attempted to form diplomatic and political ties to foreign states and movements. It received some support from China, which attempted to shift the group toward Maoism. PAC leaders, who had been vehemently anti-communist, nevertheless accepted the aid by attempting to rationalize it as being because the Chinese were "non-white" and that their value system had not been "tainted by European thought" as they deemed the South African Communist Party to have been. The result was the formation of a small Maoist faction within the APLA that contrasted the strong anti-communist currents within the PAC as a whole. However, the organization's ties with China were short-lived and the pro-Chinese members were soon after purged from the group.

=== Leadership struggles in exile ===
After the Soweto uprising in 1976, a number of students went into exile in APLA camps elsewhere on the African continent. In 1976, APLA received 500 recruits, including 178 Basotho, for a new Lesotho Liberation Army (LLA), to be formed as an offshoot of the exiled-Basutoland Congress Party under the leadership of Matooane Mapefane, who was a senior instructor of APLA in Libya. Ntantala's original group of 70 APLA soldiers felt threatened by the influx of new recruits, leading Ntantala to attempt a coup against then commander, Potlako Leballo in Dar es Salaam. This was prevented by LLA soldiers, a move which exacerbated tensions within two PAC factions, the "Diplomat-Reformist" (DR) and "Maoist-Revolutionary" (MR) factions. Vusumzi Make's appointment as Leballo's successor sparked a mutiny at Chunya, an APLA camp in Tanzania, on 11 March 1980, during which several APLA forces were killed and the rest further factionalised and confined to different camps; many escaped to Kenya. Leballo himself relocated to Zimbabwe in late 1980 along with senior intelligence and air force personnel from the MR faction. Pressure from Tanzania, however, resulted in his deportation in May–June 1981, as well as the deportation or imprisonment of the others. Make was replaced by John Nyathi Pokela (who was released from Robben Island in 1980), but his ineffectual term of office was marred by further mutinies, executions and assassinations. Following Pokela's death, Leballo made a comeback through support from Libya, North Korea and Ghana. After his sudden death in January 1986, the DR faction, outmaneuvered by the ANC, fell into disarray leaving behind the legacy of a semi-national socialist political front.

=== Attacks on white civilians ===
After 1986, APLA rejected the MR faction's concept of the guerrilla as a social reformer and instead adopted an ultimately disastrous rallying cry of "One Settler, One Bullet". In the 1990–94 period, the organisation became known for its attacks on civilians despite the progress in negotiations at the Convention for a Democratic South Africa.

==== Operation Great Storm ====
Notable massacres committed during Operation Great Storm by the Azanian People's Liberation Army between 1990 and 1994.

In 1991 APLA launched Operation Great Storm, a violent paramilitary campaign aimed at displacing white farmers to reclaim land for black Africans and obtaining arms and funding. Initially APLA attacked and robbed farmsteads in the Free State and Eastern Cape provinces resulting in a number of farm deaths. Attacks would later expand to urban civilian targets such as churches, hotels and drinking establishments. The APLA's chief commander, Sabelo Phama, declared that he "would aim his guns at children - to hurt whites where it hurts most."

Phama proclaimed 1993 as "The Year of the Great Storm" and sanctioned the following attacks on civilians:

- King William's Town Golf Club on 28 November 1992, killing four people.
- Highgate Hotel in East London on 1 May 1993, killing five people.
- Saint James Church massacre in Kenilworth on 25 July 1993, killing 11 people during a church service.
- Heidelberg Tavern Massacre in Observatory on 31 December 1993, killing four.
- Mdantsane on 11 March 1994, killing three Iranians at a Baha'i Faith meeting for being 'white'. APLA took responsibility for the attacks, stating that: "The men were shot to show there is no role in the new South Africa for any one of the race that invented apartheid or suppressed the black masses."

Additional attacks by APLA during this period included:

- Crazy Beat Disco attack in Newcastle on 14 February 1994 resulting in the death of Gerbrecht Salomina Van Wyk and the wounding of two others.

In total thirty-two applications were received for attacks on civilians. In these incidents, 24 people were killed and 122 seriously injured.

The Truth and Reconciliation Commission concluded that the PAC-sanctioned action directed towards white South Africans were "gross violations of human rights for which the PAC and APLA leadership are held to be morally and politically responsible and accountable".

=== End of the armed struggle ===
In April 1992, PAC President Clarence Makwetu declared during the PAC's Annual Congress that his party would now not oppose participation in the multi-racial negotiations to end the apartheid. In spite of their failure to achieve their goals at the negotiations, the PAC decided to participate in the 1994 elections, and PAC leader Clarence Makwetu ordered APLA to end its armed struggle.

=== Post-1994 ===
In 1994, APLA was disbanded and absorbed into the new South African National Defence Force (SANDF), although this resulted in widespread racial tension within the SANDF between the former liberation fighters and their white officers. During the 1999 Tempe military base shooting, a former APLA guerrilla that enlisted in the SANDF massacred 7 white soldiers.

== Awards ==
- Star for Bravery (Gold) (GSB)
- Operational Medal for Southern Africa
- Bravery Star (Silver) (BSS)
- Medal for Merit (Silver) (SSM)
- Decoration for Merit (Gold) (GDM)
- Medal for Merit (Bronze) (BMM)
- Service Medal (Gold)
- Service Medal (Silver) (SSM)
- Service Medal (Bronze)

== See also ==
- Military history of South Africa
- Nelson Mandela
- African National Congress
- Umkhonto we Sizwe
- Internal resistance to apartheid
