= South African military decorations order of wearing =

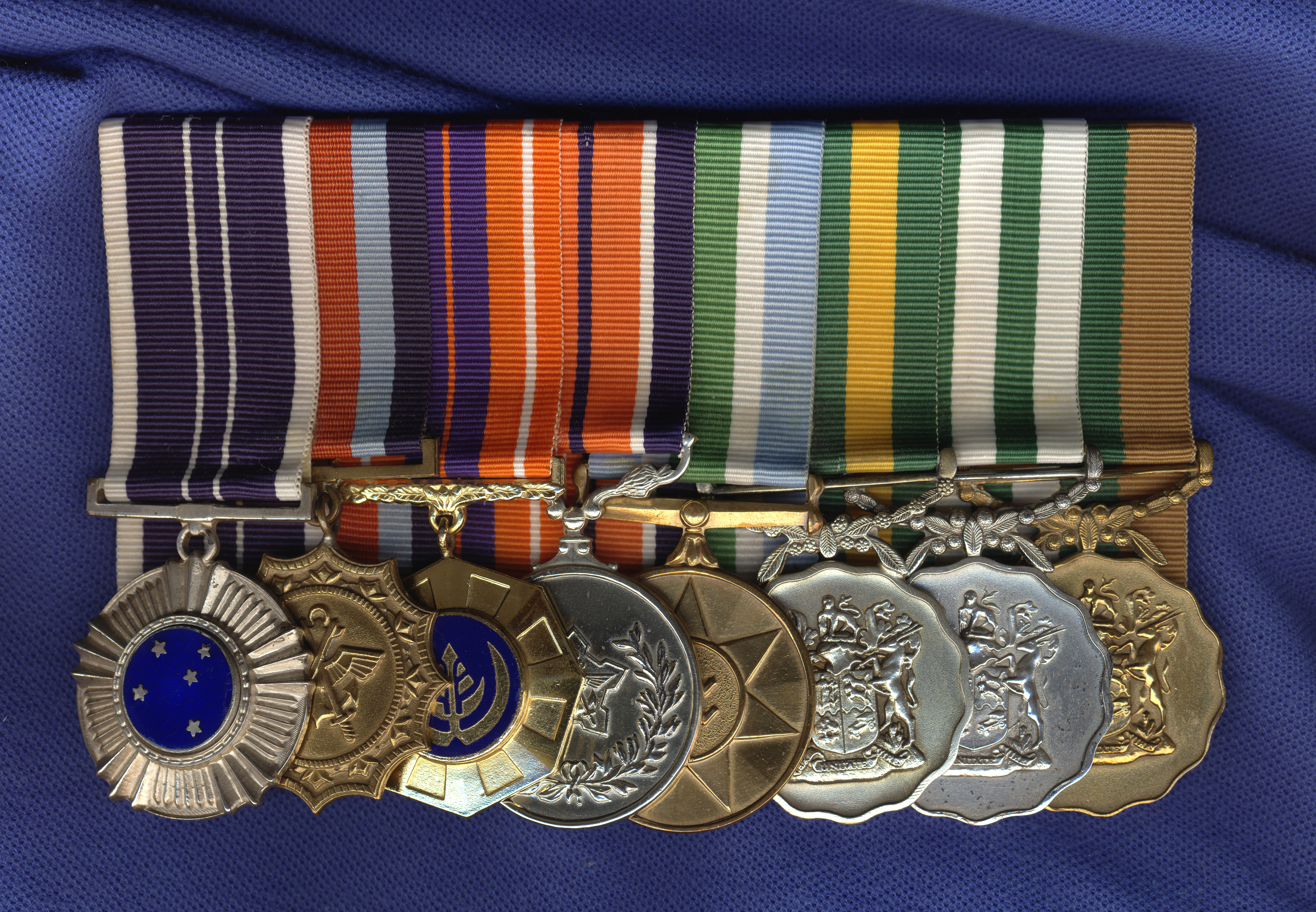

The first South African military medal was a campaign medal, the South Africa Medal, instituted in 1854 by Queen Victoria, the sovereign of the United Kingdom of Great Britain and Ireland, for award to officers and men of the Royal Navy and British Army who served on the Eastern Frontier of the Cape Colony between 1834 and 1853 during the Xhosa Wars.

Five more South African campaign medals were instituted during the Colonial era until 1910, when the Union of South Africa was established as a dominion of the British Empire. After Union and until 1952, members of the Union Defence Forces (UDF) could be awarded decorations and medals of the British Empire and, from 1949, the British Commonwealth. A number of purely South African decorations and medals were also instituted during this period, such as belated awards for Boer forces who fought in the Second Boer War, a Union commemorative medal and South African versions of some Empire medals with bilingual inscriptions in English and Dutch or Afrikaans.

The first purely South African military orders, decorations and medals were instituted in 1952 by Elizabeth II, the Queen of the United Kingdom and the Commonwealth realms. From 1961 decorations and medals were instituted by the South African State President and, between 1976 and 1994, also by the Presidents of the TBVC States, Transkei, Bophuthatswana, Venda and Ciskei. These awards were instituted in seven groups for the seven separate military and para-military forces which were integrated into the South African National Defence Force in 1994.

== The South African military ==
The Union of South Africa was established on 31 May 1910 in terms of the South Africa Act, 1909, enacted by the Parliament of the United Kingdom. In terms of Section 17 of the Act the command-in-chief of the naval and military forces within the Union was vested in the British monarch or in the Governor-General of the Union of South Africa as his representative.

The Union Defence Forces were established in 1912 in terms of the Union Defence Act, no. 13 of 1912, enacted by the Parliament of the Union of South Africa. The UDF were renamed the South African Defence Force (SADF) in 1958. On 27 April 1994 the SADF was integrated with six other independent South African military and para-military forces into the South African National Defence Force (SANDF).

The seven constituent forces of the SANDF were:

- The South African Defence Force (SADF).
- The Transkei Defence Force (TDF).
- The Bophuthatswana Defence Force (BDF).
- The Venda Defence Force (VDF).
- The Ciskei Defence Force (CDF).
- Umkhonto we Sizwe (MK), the military wing of the African National Congress (ANC).
- The Azanian People's Liberation Army (APLA), the military wing of the Pan Africanist Congress (PAC).

== Orders, decorations and medals ==
Until 31 May 1961 the Fount of Honour was the British monarch. In 1961 the State President of South Africa became the Fount of Honour. In the TBVC states, established between 1976 and 1981, the Founts of Honour were the respective State Presidents. On 27 April 1994 the President of South Africa became the Fount of Honour for all military orders, decorations and medals.

=== The Colonial and Dominion era ===
Until 1961, at first during the Colonial era and then from 1910 when the Union of South Africa was established, all military decorations and medals which were awarded to members of the Colonial Forces, the UDF and SADF were instituted by the British monarch.

=== The 1952–1975 group ===
The first purely South African military decorations and medals were instituted by the monarch of the United Kingdom and the Commonwealth realms on 6 April 1952 and, from 31 May 1961, by the State President. In 1952 a series of military decorations and medals was instituted by Queen Elizabeth II, consisting of substitutes for many of the British and Commonwealth awards which had been used until then. There were initially ten awards, to which a further eight as well as an emblem for being mentioned in dispatches were added between 1953 and 1970. All displayed the national coat of arms on the reverse, with the exception of the Union Medal and the Permanent Force Good Service Medal which had it on the obverse. Those awarded before South Africa became a republic in 1961 had Queen Elizabeth II's royal cipher above the coat of arms on the reverse.

=== The 1975–2003 group ===
During the limited representation Republican era, in July 1975, the military decorations and medals of the Republic were revised. Seven decorations and medals were carried over from the earlier series of 1952–1975 and, along with the Order of the Star of South Africa with decorations in two military and five non-military classes, thirteen new awards were instituted. They were followed by another eleven new decorations and medals between 1987 and 1991. With the exception of the Pro Virtute Decoration, the trio of Good Service Medals and the National Cadet Bisley Grand Champion Medal, all displayed the national coat of arms on the reverse.

=== The TBVC group ===
Between 1976 and 1981 the four independent republics of Transkei, Bophuthatswana, Venda and Ciskei, known collectively as the TBVC states, were established within South Africa. Each of them instituted a set of military decorations and medals for award to members of their respective defence forces.

=== The MK and APLA group ===
On 27 April 1994 South Africa became a fully representative republic. In 1996 a set of decorations and medals were instituted for award to members and veterans of MK and APLA.

=== The 2003 group ===
Finally, all but one of these earlier awards were discontinued in respect of services performed on or after 27 April 2003, when a new set of nine decorations and medals was instituted to replace them.

== Order of wear ==
Example of post-1952 South African order of wear. The medals depicted are: Southern Cross Medal (1952); Permanent Force Good Service Medal; Member of the Most Excellent Order of the British Empire; 1939–1945 Star; Africa Star; Italy Star; Defence Medal (United Kingdom); 1939–1945 War Medal; Africa Service Medal; Efficiency Medal (South Africa)

Until 5 April 1952 all South African, other Commonwealth and foreign orders, decorations and medals awarded to South Africans were worn in the order of wear as prescribed by the British Central Chancery of the Orders of Knighthood.

With effect from 6 April 1952 the aforementioned awards continued to be worn in the order of wear as prescribed on 5 April 1952 but, with one exception, took precedence after all South African orders, decorations and medals awarded to South Africans on or after that date. The exception was the Victoria Cross which, if awarded to a South African before 6 April 1952, still took precedence before all other awards.

Sorting keys

The table below lists all the South African military orders, decorations and medals in the official order of wear. All the table columns are sortable and the two columns for order of wear, "OoW 2003" and "OoW 1993", will sort the awards in either the combined order of wear which became effective on 27 April 2003, or in the individual orders of wear of the seven constituent forces which were integrated into the SANDF on 27 April 1994.

Most decorations for gallantry, distinguished and meritorious service and exceptional devotion to duty entitle the recipients to use the post-nominal letters as shown in the "PN" column of the table. These are succeeded, in order, by campaign medals in order of date of campaign, commemoration medals in order of date of institution, decorations and medals for efficiency, long service and good conduct, medals for skill at arms and proficiency in musketry, pre-1952 British era decorations and medals, and awards for voluntary and unremunerated service.

OoW 2003	Order, Decoration or Medal	PN	Type	OoW 1993	From	To
1	Victoria Cross	VC	Bravery	100	1856	1952
2	Honoris Crux Gold	HCG	Bravery	101	1975	1992
5	Gold Star for Bravery	GSB	Bravery	701	1996	2003
6	Star for Bravery in Gold	SBG	Bravery	601	1996	2003
7	Nkwe ya Gauta	NG	Bravery	801	2003	
10	Star of South Africa, Gold	SSA	Merit	102	1975	2002
22	Star of South Africa, Silver	SSAS	Merit	103	1975	2002
38	Order of the Leopard, Military Division, Commander		Merit	300	1992	1994
49	Star of South Africa	SSA	Merit	104	1952	1975
67	Louw Wepener Decoration	LWD	Bravery	105	1952	1975
72	Distinguished Gallantry Cross		Bravery	301	1982	1994
75	Gallantry Cross, Gold	GCG	Bravery	401	1985	1994
84	Honoris Crux (1952)	HC	Bravery	106	1952	1975
85	Honoris Crux Silver	HCS	Bravery	107	1975	2003
86	Van Riebeeck Decoration	DVR	Bravery	108	1952	1975
96	Honoris Crux (1975)	HC	Bravery	109	1975	2003
100	Gallantry Cross, Silver	GCS	Bravery	402	1985	1994
105	Cross for Bravery		Bravery	201	1994	1994
108	Bravery Star in Silver	BSS	Bravery	702	1996	2003
109	Star for Bravery in Silver	SBS	Bravery	602	1996	2003
110	Nkwe ya Selefera	NS	Bravery	802	2003	
112	Pro Virtute Decoration	PVD	Bravery	110	1987	2003
113	Southern Cross Decoration	SD	Merit	111	1975	2003
114	Pro Merito Decoration	PMD	Merit	112	1975	2003
115	Conspicuous Leadership Star	CLS	Bravery	603	1996	2003
116	Star for Conspicuous Leadership	SCL	Bravery	703	1996	2003
125	Defence Force Merit Decoration		Merit	302	1982	1994
129	Distinguished Service Medal, Gold		Merit	403	1985	1994
132	Sandile Decoration	SD	Merit	501	1988	1994
136	Decoration for Merit in Gold	DMG	Merit	604	1996	2003
137	Gold Decoration for Merit	GDM	Merit	704	1996	2003
138	iPhrothiya yeGolide	PG	Merit	803	2003	
152	Van Riebeeck Medal	VRM	Bravery	113	1952	1975
153	Louw Wepener Medal	LWM	Bravery	114	1967	1975
154	Distinguished Gallantry Medal		Bravery	303	1982	1994
156	Nkwe ya Boronse	NB	Bravery	804	2003	
158	Ad Astra Decoration	AAD	Bravery	115	1991	2003
159	Army Cross	CM	Bravery	116	1987	2003
160	Air Force Cross	CA	Bravery	117	1987	2003
161	Navy Cross	CN	Bravery	118	1987	2003
162	Medical Service Cross	CC	Bravery	119	1987	2003
163	Southern Cross Medal (1952)	SM	Merit	120	1952	1975
164	Pro Merito Medal (1967)	PMM	Merit	121	1967	1975
170	Distinguished Service Medal, Silver		Merit	404	1985	1994
180	Southern Cross Medal (1975)	SM	Merit	122	1975	2003
181	Pro Merito Medal (1975)	PMM	Merit	123	1975	2003
185	Defence Force Merit Medal		Merit	304	1982	1994
187	Sandile Medal	SM	Merit	502	1988	1994
189	Marumo Medal, Class I		Merit	305	1988	1994
193	Merit Medal in Silver	MMS	Merit	605	1996	2003
194	Silver Medal for Merit	SMM	Merit	705	1996	2003
195	iPhrothiya yeSiliva	PS	Merit	805	2003	
199	Danie Theron Medal	DTM	Merit	124	1970	1993
200	Jack Hindon Medal	JHM	Merit	125	1970	1975
201	Military Merit Medal	MMM	Merit	126	1974	2003
204	Defence Force Commendation Medal		Merit	306	1982	1994
205	Venda Defence Force Medal		Merit	405	1984	1994
209	Marumo Medal, Class II		Merit	307	1988	1994
210	Transkei Defence Force Medal		Merit	202	1994	1994
211	Bronze Medal for Merit	BMM	Merit	706	1996	2003
212	Merit Medal in Bronze	MMB	Merit	606	1996	2003
213	iPhrothiya yeBhronzi	PB	Merit	806	2003	
214	Chief C.D.F. Commendation Medal		Merit	504	1992	1994
215.2	Korea Medal		Campaign	127.2	1953	1953
217	Pro Patria Medal		Campaign	128	1974	1994
222	General Service Medal (Venda)		Campaign	406	1985	1994
225	Southern Africa Medal		Campaign	129	1987	1994
226	General Service Medal (South Africa)		Campaign	130	1987	2003
227	Ciskei Defence Medal		Campaign	505	1988	1994
228	Nkwe Medal		Campaign	308	1990	1994
229	General Service Medal (Bophuthatswana)		Campaign	309	1991	1994
230	Operational Medal for Southern Africa		Campaign	607	1998	2003
231	South Africa Service Medal		Campaign	608	1998	2003
232	Tshumelo Ikatelaho		Campaign	807	2003	
233	Queen Elizabeth II Coronation Medal		Commem.	131	1953	1953
234	Independence Medal (Transkei)		Commem.	203	1976	1976
235	Independence Medal (Bophuthatswana)		Commem.	310	1977	1977
237	Independence Medal (Venda)		Commem.	407	1979	1979
240	Independence Medal (Ciskei)		Commem.	506	1981	1981
250	Military Rule Medal		Commem.	204	1994	1994
251	Unitas Medal		Commem.	808	1994	1994
252	Closure Commemoration Medal		Commem.	809	2003	
253	Medalje vir Troue Diens and Bar, 50 years		Service	810	2003	
254	Medal for Distinguished Conduct and Loyal Service		Service	132	1987	2003
255	Medalje vir Troue Diens and Bar, 40 years		Service	811	2003	
262	Good Service Medal, Gold		Service	133	1975	2003
269	Medal for Long Service and Good Conduct, Gold		Service	311	1982	1994
273	Long Service Medal, Gold		Service	408	1985	1994
282	Gold Service Medal		Service	707	1996	2003
283	Service Medal in Gold		Service	609	1996	2003
284	Medalje vir Troue Diens and Bar, 30 years		Service	812	2003	
285	John Chard Decoration	JCD	Service	134	1952	2003
286	De Wet Decoration	DWD	Service	135	1965	2003
287	Cadet Corps Medal		Service	136	1966	1986
288	Good Service Medal, Silver		Service	137	1975	2003
296	Medal for Long Service and Good Conduct, Silver		Service	312	1982	1994
300	Long Service Medal, Silver		Service	409	1985	1994
310	Service Medal in Silver		Service	610	1996	2003
311	Silver Service Medal		Service	708	1996	2003
312	Medalje vir Troue Diens and Bar, 20 years	RD ♠	Service	813	2003	
316	Union Medal		Service	138	1952	1961
318	Permanent Force Good Service Medal		Service	139	1961	1975
324	John Chard Medal		Service	140	1952	2003
326	Good Service Medal, Bronze		Service	141	1975	2003
333	Medal for Long Service and Good Conduct, Bronze		Service	313	1982	1994
337	Long Service Medal, Bronze		Service	410	1985	1994
342	De Wet Medal		Service	142	1987	2003
343	Faithful Service Medal		Service	205	1987	1994
344	Medal for Long Service, Bronze		Service	507	1988	1994
350	Bronze Service Medal		Service	709	1996	2003
351	Service Medal in Bronze		Service	611	1996	2003
352	Medalje vir Troue Diens		Service	814	2003	
356	Queen's Medal for Champion Shots in the Military Forces		Bisley	143	1924	1961
357	Commandant General's Medal		Bisley	144	1965	1975
358	SADF Champion Shot Medal		Bisley	145	1975	2003
359	National Cadet Bisley Grand Champion Medal		Bisley	146	1987	
360	President's Medal for Shooting		Bisley	508	1988	1994
361	State President's Medal for Shooting		Bisley	314	1990	1994
375	Dekoratie voor Trouwe Dienst	DTD	Merit	147.04	1920	1946
376	Distinguished Service Order	DSO	Bravery	147.05	1886	1952
379	Distinguished Service Cross	DSC	Bravery	147.08	1901	1952
380	Military Cross	MC	Bravery	147.09	1914	1952
381	Distinguished Flying Cross	DFC	Bravery	147.10	1918	1952
382	Air Force Cross	AFC	Bravery	147.11	1918	1952
383.1	Distinguished Conduct Medal	DCM	Bravery	147.12	1854	1952
383.2	Distinguished Conduct Medal (Natal)	DCM	Bravery	147.13	1897	1913
384.1	Conspicuous Gallantry Medal	CGM	Bravery	147.141	1874	1952
384.2	Conspicuous Gallantry Medal (Flying)	CGM	Bravery	147.142	1943	1952
385	Distinguished Service Medal	DSM	Bravery	147.15	1914	1952
386	Military Medal	MM	Bravery	147.16	1916	1952
387	Distinguished Flying Medal	DFM	Bravery	147.17	1918	1952
388	Air Force Medal	AFM	Bravery	147.18	1918	1952
389	British Empire Medal (Military)	BEM	Merit	147.19	1922	1952
402.1834	South Africa Medal (1853)		Campaign	148.1834	1854	
402.1877	South Africa Medal (1880)		Campaign	148.1877	1880	
402.1880	Cape of Good Hope General Service Medal		Campaign	148.1880	1900	
402.18991	Queen's South Africa Medal		Campaign	148.18991	1900	
402.18992	Medalje voor de Anglo-Boere Oorlog		Campaign	148.18992	1920	1982
402.18993	Lint voor Verwonding		Campaign	148.18993	1920	1949
402.1902	King's South Africa Medal		Campaign	148.1902	1902	
402.1906	Natal Native Rebellion Medal		Campaign	148.1906	1907	
402.19142	1914–15 Star		Campaign	148.19142	1918	
402.19143	British War Medal		Campaign	148.19143	1919	
402.19146	Mercantile Marine War Medal		Campaign	148.19146	1919	
402.19144	Victory Medal (South Africa)		Campaign	148.19144	1919	
402.19391	1939–1945 Star		Campaign	148.19391	1943	
402.19392	Atlantic Star		Campaign	148.19392	1945	
402.19393	Arctic Star		Campaign	148.19393	2012	
402.19394	Air Crew Europe Star		Campaign	148.19394	1945	
402.19395	Africa Star		Campaign	148.19395	1943	
402.19396	Pacific Star		Campaign	148.19396	1945	
402.19397	Burma Star		Campaign	148.19397	1945	
402.19398	Italy Star		Campaign	148.19398	1945	
402.19399	France and Germany Star		Campaign	148.19399	1945	
402.19451	Defence Medal (United Kingdom)		Campaign	148.19451	1945	
402.19452	War Medal 1939–1945		Campaign	148.19452	1945	
402.19453	Africa Service Medal		Campaign	148.19453	1943	
402.2	King George V Coronation Medal		Commem.	148.2	1911	1911
402.3	King George V Silver Jubilee Medal		Commem.	148.3	1935	1935
402.4	King George VI Coronation Medal		Commem.	148.4	1937	1937
403.0	Meritorious Service Medal (United Kingdom)	MSM ♥	Gallantry	149.0	1916	1928
403.1	Meritorious Service Medal (Cape of Good Hope)		Service	149.01	1896	1913
403.2	Meritorious Service Medal (Natal)		Service	149.02	1897	1913
403.3	Meritorious Service Medal (South Africa)		Service	149.03	1914	1939
403.4	Army Long Service and Good Conduct Medal (Cape)		Service	149.04	1896	1910
403.5	Army Long Service and Good Conduct Medal (Natal)		Service	149.05	1897	1910
403.6	Permanent Forces of the Empire Beyond the Seas Medal		Service	149.06	1910	1930
403.7	Medal for Long Service and Good Conduct (South Africa)		Service	149.07	1930	1952
404.1	Volunteer Officers' Decoration for India and the Colonies	VD	Service	150.1	1894	1899
404.2	Volunteer Long Service Medal for India and the Colonies		Service	150.2	1896	1899
404.3	Colonial Auxiliary Forces Officers' Decoration	VD	Service	150.3	1899	1930
404.4	Colonial Auxiliary Forces Long Service Medal		Service	150.4	1899	1930
404.9	Efficiency Decoration (South Africa)	ED	Service	150.5	1930	1952
405	Efficiency Medal (South Africa)		Service	151	1930	1952
406	Decoration for Officers of the R.N.V.R.	VRD	Service	152	1915	1952
407	R.N.V.R. Long Service and Good Conduct Medal		Service	153	1915	1952
408	Air Efficiency Award	AE ♣	Service	154	1942	1952
418	Union of South Africa Commemoration Medal		Commem.	162	1910	1911
420	South African Medal for War Services		Volunteer	163	1945	
420.1851	Sir Harry Smith's Medal for Gallantry		Unofficial	164.1851	1851	
420.1899	Johannesburg Vrijwilliger Corps Medal		Unofficial	164.1899	1899	
420.1900	Kimberley Star		Unofficial	164.1900	1900	
420.1902	Cape Copper Company Medal for the Defence of O'okiep		Unofficial	164.1902	1902	

Notes

- ♠ In respect of recipients of the Emblem for Reserve Force Service only, indicating "Reserve Distinction".
- ♥ Use of the post-nominal MSM was restricted to awards for acts of gallantry during the First World War.
- ♣ Use of the post-nominal AE was restricted to officers only.

== Errors and exclusions ==
The official order of wear of 2005 contains the caveat that, in the absence of full information on some awards, there may be among the awards listed for the TBVC states some which were never awarded. The official list contains minor errors, one of these being the post-nominal letters "VRD" instead of "DVR" for the Van Riebeeck Decoration. The post-nominal letters "VRD" are used for the Royal Naval Volunteer Reserve Decoration.

The following decorations and medals are excluded from the table:

- Civil, police, prisons and other non-military decorations and medals.
- Military decorations which, while officially instituted, were never awarded and now never will be. These include:
  - The Castle of Good Hope Decoration (CGH) (South Africa).
  - The Honoris Crux Diamond (HCD) (South Africa).
  - The Pro Virtute Medal (PVM) (South Africa).
  - The Cross for Valour (CCV) (Ciskei).
  - The Cross for Gallantry (CCG) (Ciskei).
  - The Cross for Bravery (CCB) (Ciskei).
  - The Pro Merito Decoration (PMD) (Ciskei).
