= Bophuthatswana Defence Force =

Defence force of the Republic of Bophuthatswana

- Bophuthatswana Weermag
- Flag of the BDF
- Founded: 6 December 1977
- Disbanded: April 1994
- Service branches: Infantry; Special Forces; Air Force
- Headquarters: Mmabatho

Leadership
- Commander-in-chief: Lucas Mangope
- Chief of the Defence Force: Maj. Gen. H.S. Turner

Personnel
- Military age: 18–49
- Deployed personnel: 3,000 (1988)

Related articles
- History: Military history of South Africa
- Ranks: Military ranks of Bophuthatswana

The Bophuthatswana Defence Force (Afrikaans: Bophuthatswana Weermag; BDF) was established on 6 December 1977 from trainees of the South African Defence Force. It was the defence force of the Republic of Bophuthatswana, a nominally independent bantustan during the Apartheid era of South Africa.

== Organisation and structure ==
A National Guard of about 125 soldiers initially formed the Bophuthatswana National Guard in time for the independence of Bophuthatswana. Initially this group merely performed ceremonial duties and was housed within the office of the President.

A SADF Officer, Brigadier Riekerk, served as a military adviser to President Lucas Mangope. Over time an embryonic Department of Defence was developed resulting in the establishment of the Bophuthatswana Defence Force (BDF) on the 30 November 1979 with Brigadier Riekerk as the Minister of Defence and Lt Col Jack Turner as the Chief of the BDF.

== Development of the BDF ==
=== Bases and areas of command ===
The BDF developed military areas and bases at:

- 1 Military Area covered the region of Mafikeng, Mmabatho, and Lehurutse and housed:
  - The Molopo base, with One Infantry Battalion, the Military School and the Technical Services Unit
  - The Lehuru Tshe base, with the Parachute Battalion
- 2 Military Area covered the region of Mankwe and Moretele and housed:
  - The Mankwe base, with Two Infantry Battalion, a COIN unit
  - The Bafokeng base, a company group base
  - The Odi base, a company group base
- 3 Military Area covered the region of Thaba’Nchu and Taung and housed:
  - The Thaba’Nchu base, a company group base and
  - The Taung base, a company group base.

=== Units ===
==== One BDF Infantry Battalion ====
The first true armed unit formed was One Infantry Battalion based at Molopo, while its training wing eventually formed the Military School.

==== Technical Services Unit ====
A Technical Services Unit at Molopo was also formed from a Light Workshop Troop.

==== Two BDF Infantry Battalion ====
A second Infantry Battalion was formed and based at Mankwe, specialising in COIN operations.

==== Parachute and Special Forces ====
A Parachute Battalion and Special Forces Unit was also formed. Together these units formed the Task Force.

==== Other units ====
- BDF Signals Unit with a Supply Depot was housed at the old Mafikeng Air Base after the establishment of Air Force Base Mmabatho.
- BDF Supply Depot
- BDF Maintenance Unit

==== Air Wing ====
Based at Air Force Base Mmabatho and consisted of:

• A Transport Wing: Operated CASA 212, CASA 235 and Pilatus PC-6

• A Helicopter Wing: Aérospatiale Alouette III and BK 117s

• A Training Wing: Pilatus PC-7

Brigadier M.P. Janse van Rensburg as Chief fell under the Chief of the BDF.

=== Attempted coup ===
The establishment of the Bophuthatswana National Security Unit as an addendum to the BDF in 1986 may have contributed to the aborted coup attempt of 2 February 1988. This unit was primarily responsible for the provision of infrastructure. One contentious issue was the low entry requirements for the BNSU compared to that of the BDF, resulting in dissatisfaction.

After the coup was thwarted through the intervention of the SADF, Brigadier Riekert resigned as Minister of Defence and President Mangope personally took over the defence portfolio. The BNSU was disbanded and a small number of former BNSU members were allowed to join the BDF. For practical reasons, a Defence Committee under the chairmanship of Minister Rowan Cronje was established to assist the Chief of the BDF in dealing with welfare and social issues, since these were considered to be the most important sources of the dissatisfaction which had contributed to the coup attempt. Minister Cronje subsequently took over the defence portfolio in 1991.

=== Invasion of Bophuthatswana ===
On 11 March 1994, following a request from President Mangope for assistance from the Afrikaner Volksfront, hundreds of Afrikaner Weerstandsbeweging (AWB) members unlawfully entered Bophuthatswana from South Africa, to "help" restore control in the face of a strike by civil servants, resulting in 42 residents of Mafikeng killed and three AWB members shot dead by a Bophuthatswana Police sergeant.

The unrest ended when SADF was officially requested to assist in restoring safety and security, by General Turner (Chief of BDF). The request was done as per security agreement between the BDF and SADF. Bophuthatswana was then soon thereafter placed under the control of the South African government.

Shortly afterwards, Mangope was removed from power and a temporary administrator was put in place by the South African Transitional Executive Council

=== Disbandment ===
During the historical 1994 South African general election, 2 Special Service Battalion, SA Army, took part in Operation Baccarat (stability in Mmabatho and Passado (border protection) to ensure stability in the North West Province.

On 19 December 1994, the Bophuthatswana Defence Force Parachute Battalion at Gopane was placed under operational command of 2 SSB, as part of the founding of the SANDF. 2 SSB withdrew simultaneously from Nietverdiend and Nooitgedacht. From August 1994 to 15 June 1995 successful bridging training was provided for 550 formerly non-statutory force members.

With the end of Apartheid in 1994 in South Africa, the former defence forces of the bantustans were incorporated into the newly formed South African National Defence Force.

The SANDF's new 10 South African Infantry Battalion heraldry clearly originates from the Bophuthatswana Defence Force, its forebear.

=== Insignia ===
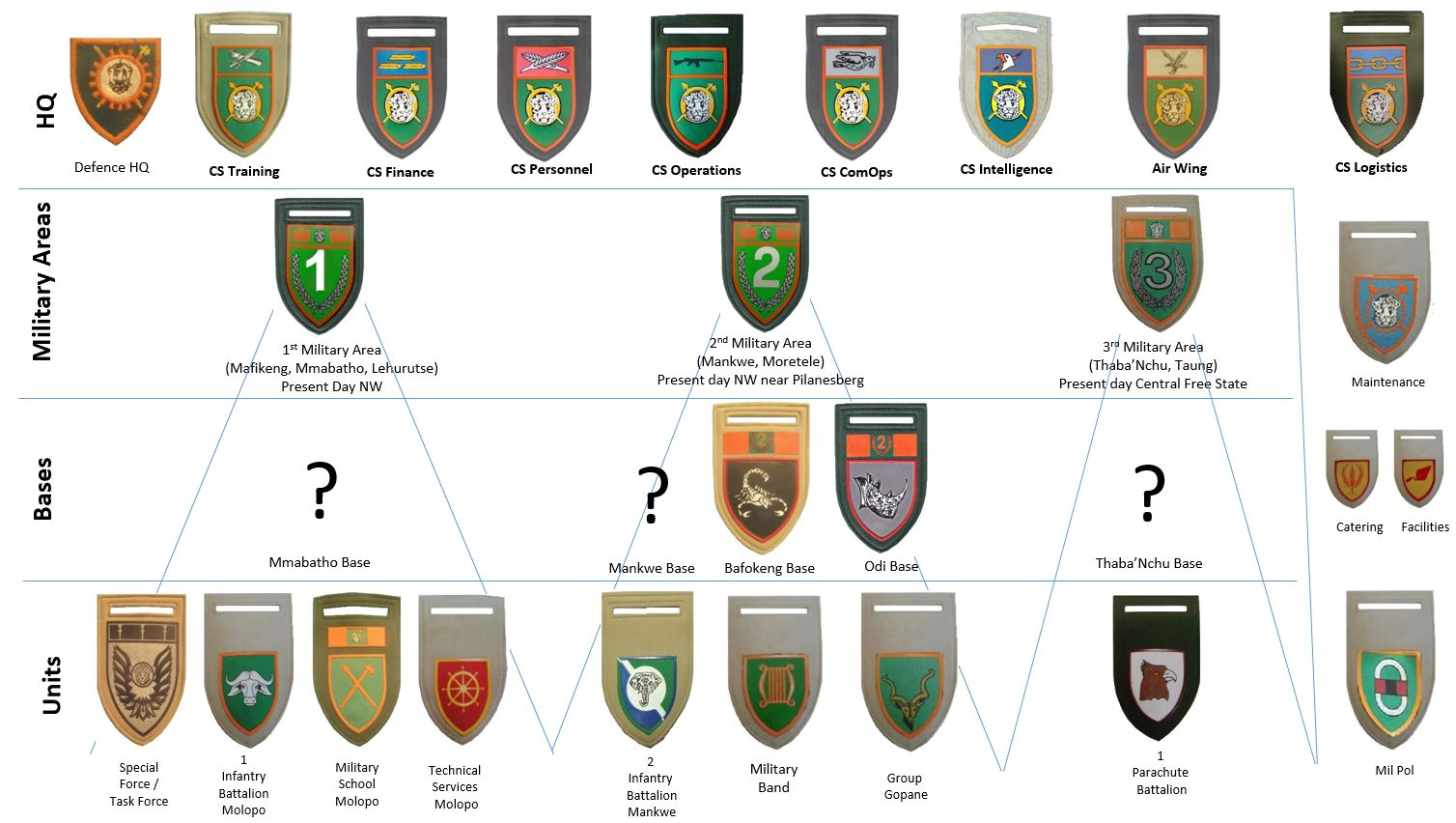
Bophuthatswana Defence Force Structure

== Ranks ==
The ranks of the BDF were:

=== Commissioned officer ranks ===
The rank insignia of commissioned officers.

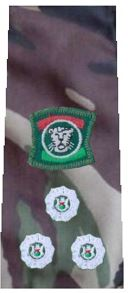
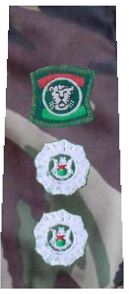
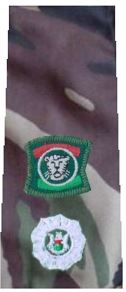
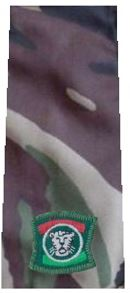
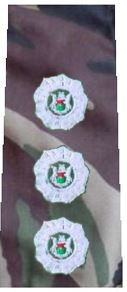
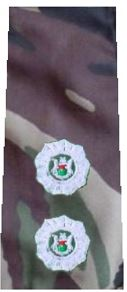
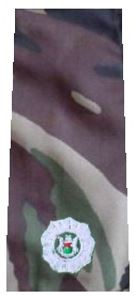
Rank group	General / flag officers		Senior officers			Junior officers
Bophuthatswana Army
Bophuthatswana Army	Major general	Brigadier	Colonel	Commandant	Major	Captain	Lieutenant	Second lieutenant
Bophuthatswana Army	Generaal-majoor	Brigadier	Kolonel	Kommandant	Majoor	Kaptein	Luitenant	Tweede luitenant
Bophuthatswana Air Force
Bophuthatswana Air Force		Brigadier	Colonel	Commandant	Major	Captain	Lieutenant	Second lieutenant
Bophuthatswana Air Force		Brigadier	Kolonel	Kommandant	Majoor	Kaptein	Luitenant	Tweede luitenant

==== Student officer ranks ====
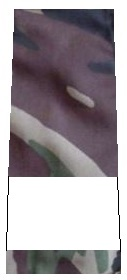
Rank group	Student officer
Bophuthatswana Army
Bophuthatswana Army	Officer candidate Kandidaat offisier

=== Other ranks ===
The rank insignia of non-commissioned officers and enlisted personnel.

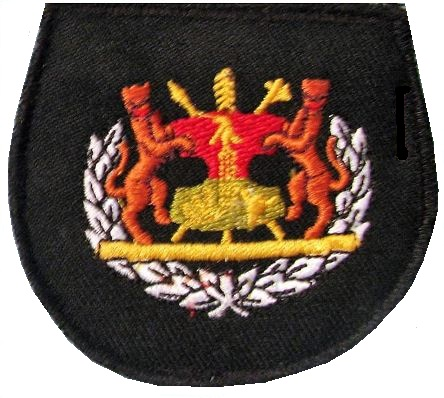
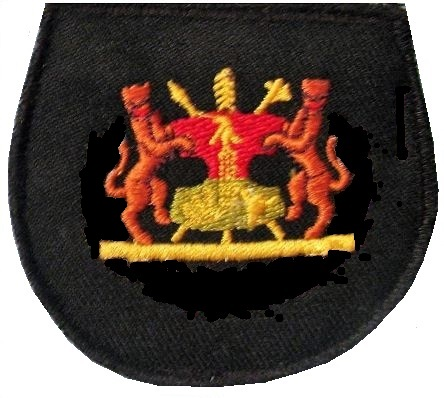
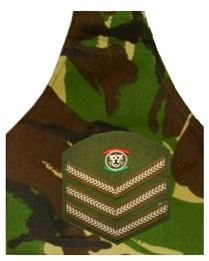
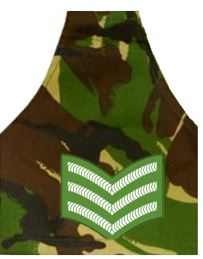
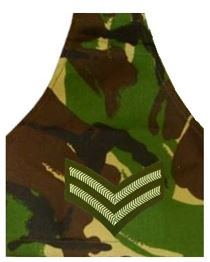
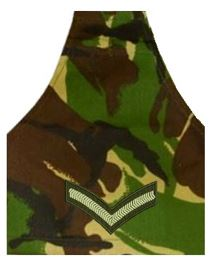
Rank group	Senior NCOs					Junior NCOs		Enlisted
Bophuthatswana Army								No insignia
Bophuthatswana Army	Warrant officer class 1		Warrant officer class 2	Staff sergeant	Sergeant	Corporal	Lance corporal	Private
Bophuthatswana Army	Adjudant-Offisier Klass I		Adjudant-Offisier Klass II	Staf-Sersant	Sersant	Korporaal	Onderkorporaal	Soldaat
Bophuthatswana Air Force								No insignia
Bophuthatswana Air Force	Sergeant Major of the Air Force	Warrant officer class 1	Warrant officer class 2	Staff sergeant	Sergeant	Corporal	Lance corporal	Private
Bophuthatswana Air Force	Sersant-Majoor van die Lugmag	Adjudant-Offisier Klass I	Adjudant-Offisier Klass II	Staf-Sersant	Sersant	Korporaal	Onderkorporaal	Soldaat

== Equipment ==
The BDF was equipped for counter-insurgency (COIN) operations. The BDF used:

- R4/R5 assault rifles,
- 7,62 mm Light Machine Gun
- 40 mm Multiple Grenade Launcher,
- 60 mm and 81 mm mortars and
- M2 12.7mm HMGs.
- 105mm Recoilless Rifle

Vehicles included Mambas, Buffels, Samil 20, seven-ton Isuzu trucks, and 4x4 vehicles.

== Medals ==
- Distinguished Gallantry Cross
- Merit Decoration
- Distinguished Gallantry Medal
- Merit Medal
- Marumo Medal (Class I)
- Commendation Medal
- Marumo Medal (Class II)
- Nkwe Medal
- General Service Medal (Bophuthatswana)
- Independence Medal (Bophuthatswana)
- Medal for Long Service and Good Conduct (Gold)
- Medal for Long Service and Good Conduct (Silver)
- Medal for Long Service and Good Conduct (Bronze)
- Order of the Leopard (Military Division - Commander)
- State President's Medal for Shooting
