= Independence Medal =

The Independence Medal can refer to any one of the following medals:

- Centenary of National Independence Commemorative Medal (Belgium)
- Ceylon Armed Services Inauguration Medal
- Cross of Independence (Poland)
- Fiji Independence Medal
- Independence Medal (Bophuthatswana)
- Independence Medal (Ciskei)
- Independence Medal (Lithuania)
- Independence Medal (Transkei)
- Independence Medal (Venda)
- Indian Independence Medal
- Jamaica Independence Medal
- Malawi Independence Medal
- Medal of Independence (Turkey)
- Nigerian Independence Medal
- Pakistan Medal
- Papua New Guinea Independence Medal
- Philippine Independence Medal
- Sierra Leone Independence Medal
- Solomon Islands Independence Medal
- Uganda Independence Medal
- Union of South Africa Commemoration Medal
- Zimbabwean Independence Medal, 1980

== See also ==
- Medal of Independence (disambiguation)
