= Defence Medal =

The Defence Medal or Defense Medal may refer to:

- Defence Medal (United Kingdom), British Commonwealth and Empire medal for service during World War II
- Australian Defence Medal, awarded since 2006
- Ciskei Defence Medal, awarded in the Republic of Ciskei from 1988 to 1994
- Civil Defence Medal, awarded in the United Kingdom and associated territories from 1961 to 2007
- Defence Medal 1940–1945, Norwegian medal for defence of Norway during World War II
- National Defence Medal, a French military decoration awarded since 1982
- Philippine Defense Medal, Philippine medal for resistance against the Japanese invasion between December 1941 and June 1942
