= Eustace St Clair Hill =

Catholic priest (1873–1953)

The Reverend Eustace St Clair Hill, CR
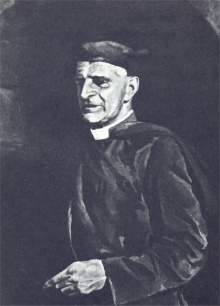
- Father Eustace Hill painted by Hugh Dent
- Native name: Eustace St. Clair Hill
- Born: 15 February 1873
- Died: 12 February 1953 (aged 79)

Eustace St. Clair Hill (15 February 1873 – 12 February 1953) MC was an Anglican priest of the South African Brigade during the First World War. He won the Military Cross for bravery at the Butte de Warlencourt where he lost his right hand. He was back at Longueval and Delville Wood in 1919 identifying and burying the dead of his Brigade. After the war he returned to St. John's College and became their headmaster from 1922 to 1930. He was responsible for the extension of the school's buildings and for the chapel which was dedicated as a war memorial, and contains one of the five crosses made from the remains of the trees at the Battle of Delville Wood. Eustace Hill did not approve of contraception and converted to Catholicism in 1938. He became a monk in 1939, taking the name Brother James. He entered a monastery in Hampshire and remained there until his death on 12 February 1953.

== Early life ==
Eustace St. Clair Hill was born on 15 February 1873 to Agnes Jane Pennell and James Turner Hill, a Major-General of the 4th Bengal Native Infantry. After attending school at Lancing College in Sussex, he went to Christ Church, Oxford where in 1895 he obtained his BA. Thereafter, he studied for the priesthood, being made a deacon in 1896 and being ordained as a priest in 1897. His first posting was as the Curate of Wrexham in North Wales. In 1898, he sailed to South Africa to become the chaplain of St Peter's Home, Grahamstown.

== Boer War Service ==
In July 1899, after less than a year at St Peter's, Eustace Hill volunteered as a chaplain in the event of war breaking out between the Boers and the British. After the Boer War had broken out in September of that year, Hill was attached to Lord Methuen's column. This column was sent to relieve the siege of Kimberley and later Mafeking. During this time, he was involved in ministering to the British soldiers at Modder River and Magersfontein, two of the major battles in this theatre of the war. In April 1900, Hill became sick with fever and returned to England on three months' sick leave.

By the time he arrived back in South Africa in July 1900, Mafeking had been relieved and Pretoria had fallen. The Boer War had become a guerilla war. The British forces roamed the countryside trying to pin the Boer forces down by trapping them between two forces and by depriving them of local support through the destruction of their farms and houses, and through the internment of their families. Padre Hill was involved in supporting these roving groups, though he was unpopular due to his insistence on preventing any looting or maltreatment of the Boers.

== After the Boer War ==
In April 1901, Eustace Hill was appointed Assistant Chaplain to the Railway Mission at Naauwpoort in the Eastern Cape, as well as being responsible for ministering to the soldiers of the nearby military camp. In 1904 he joined the Community of the Resurrection, an Anglican religious order that had been founded in 1892. In 1905 he was appointed to the staff of St John's College in Johannesburg. He took a leave of absence from the school in 1906 to support the colonial forces involved in suppressing the Bambata rebellion.

== Chaplain on the Western Front ==
Father Hill was one of the first to volunteer his services as a military chaplain in 1914. He initially saw action at Luderitz in South West Africa with the South African Overseas Expeditionary Force (SAOEF). He was then involved in the Senussi campaign in Egypt the following year. In 1916 he was transferred to Europe where he served on the Western Front. In July 1916 he was intimately involved in the Somme battles of Longueval and Delville Wood. At Butte de Warlencourt, he lost his right arm and was awarded the Military Cross in late 1916.

At Marrieres Wood on 24 March 1918, he was captured and served the remainder of the war as a prisoner of war. He was released in November 1918.

== St John’s College ==
He returned to St. John's College and became the headmaster there from 1922 to 1930. Though seen as somewhat eccentric as a result of his war experiences, his elevation to the post brought a sense of vigour to the school. He was responsible for the extension of the school's buildings and particularly for the chapel which was dedicated in 1926. Fittingly, the chapel was dedicated as a war memorial and contains one of the five crosses made from the remains of the trees at the battle of Delville Wood.

== Later life ==
In 1930 at the Seventh Lambeth Conference, the Anglican Church approved birth control under limited circumstances. Eustace Hill did not approve of contraception and converted to Catholicism in 1938. He became a monk in 1939, taking the name Brother James. He entered a monastery in Hampshire and remained there until his death on 12 February 1953, three days short of his eightieth birthday. Father Hill never married.

== Bravery ==
Hill's bravery, coupled with an unshakeable belief in the rightness of what he was doing, meant that he had little concern for his own personal safety. He did not hesitate to take his very practical ministry to the front line and consequently became well known for his bravery. At Butte de Warlencourt, he received the third highest award for bravery, the Military Cross. Hill absolutely abhorred any form of cowardice and spent considerable effort exhorting his men to do their Christian duty under fire. He didn't question the purpose or shy away from the danger but rather exhorted the soldiers with words such as "Men, they may kill your bodies, but they cannot destroy your souls".

One example of his bravery was when, during the Boer War he received a threatening note from Lord Methuen that "if he was seen in the front line again he would be sent home". He also gained respect from his time serving on the Western Front, where he stood up and moved around the battlefield, dodging artillery shells and machine gun bullets in pursuit of his ministry.

== Hill the Military Chaplain ==
Though Father Hill came from a distinguished military family and subsequently held a rigid approach to the business of soldiering, he felt passionate about the priesthood - particularly the pastoral side of ministry. His strong beliefs in the duty for all soldiers to fight like men and to be prepared to sacrifice their lives is likely the result of his family's military background and the nature of the late Victorian Imperial culture at the time.

During the Boer War, Father Hill established an effective way for military chaplains to function within the military under conflict situations, and it was this experience that made him favoured and respected by the troops, and a acclaimed as a national hero in the First World War.

Hill also campaigned for the establishment of an independent chaplaincy corps within the military.
