= LWM =

LWM could refer to:

- Lawrence Municipal Airport (Massachusetts), US, IATA code
- Llantwit Major railway station, Wales, station code
- Louw Wepener Medal, South Africa
