= Distinguished Service Medal, Silver =

- Type: Military decoration for merit
- Awarded for: Outstanding service and devotion to duty
- Country: Venda
- Presented by: the President
- Eligibility: All Ranks
- Status: Discontinued in 1994
- Established: 1985
- Ribbon bar

VDF pre-1994 & SANDF post-2002 orders of wear
- Next (higher): VDF precedence: Distinguished Service Medal, Gold; SANDF precedence: Pro Merito Medal (1967)
- Next (lower): VDF succession: Venda Defence Force Medal; SANDF succession: Southern Cross Medal (1975)

The Distinguished Service Medal, Silver was instituted by the President of the Republic of Venda in 1985, for award to all ranks for outstanding service and devotion to duty.

== The Venda Defence Force ==
The 900 member Venda Defence Force (VDF) was established upon that country's independence on 13 September 1979. The Republic of Venda ceased to exist on 27 April 1994 and the Venda Defence Force was amalgamated with six other military forces into the South African National Defence Force (SANDF).

== Institution ==
The Distinguished Service Medal, Silver was instituted by the President of Venda in 1985. It is the middle award of a set of three decorations for merit, along with the Distinguished Service Medal, Gold and the Venda Defence Force Medal.

Venda's military decorations and medals were modeled on those of the Republic of South Africa and these three decorations are the approximate equivalents of, respectively, the Southern Cross Decoration and Pro Merito Decoration, the Southern Cross Medal (1975) and Pro Merito Medal (1975), and the Military Merit Medal.

== Award criteria ==
The medal could be awarded to all ranks for outstanding service and devotion to duty.

== Order of wear ==
Since the Distinguished Service Medal, Silver was authorised for wear by one of the statutory forces which came to be part of the South African National Defence Force on 27 April 1994, it was accorded a position in the official South African order of precedence on that date.

Venda Defence Force until 26 April 1994

- Official VDF order of precedence:
  - Preceded by the Distinguished Service Medal, Gold.
  - Succeeded by the Venda Defence Force Medal.
- Venda official national order of precedence:
  - Preceded by the National Force Outstanding Service Medal (SOE).
  - Succeeded by the Police Star for Outstanding Service (SOE).

South African National Defence Force from 27 April 1994

- Official SANDF order of precedence:
  - Preceded by the Pro Merito Medal (1967) (PMM) of the Republic of South Africa.
  - Succeeded by the Southern Cross Medal (1975) (SM) of the Republic of South Africa.
- Official national order of precedence:
  - Preceded by the KwaZulu Police Star for Outstanding Service.
  - Succeeded by the Police Star for Outstanding Service (SOE) of the Republic of Venda.

The position of the Distinguished Service Medal, Silver in the official order of precedence was revised twice after 1994, to accommodate the inclusion or institution of new decorations and medals, first in April 1996 when decorations and medals were belatedly instituted for the two former non-statutory forces, the Azanian People's Liberation Army and Umkhonto we Sizwe, and again upon the institution of a new set of honours on 27 April 2003, but it remained unchanged on both occasions.

The Distinguished Service Medal, Silver is, in effect, Venda's equivalent of the South African Southern Cross Medal (1975) and Pro Merito Medal (1975). It would appear, therefore, as though the position of the Distinguished Service Medal, Silver, instituted in 1985, in the official order of precedence was allocated in error. According to their dates of institution, it should have taken precedence after the Pro Merito Medal (1975) and not after the Pro Merito Medal (1967). Its correct position in the order of wear would therefore be after Bophuthatswana's Defence Force Merit Medal of 1982 and before Ciskei's Sandile Medal of 1988.

== Description ==
Obverse

The Distinguished Service Medal, Silver is a medallion, struck in silver, 38 millimetres in diameter, with the letter V above two interlaced rings.

Reverse

The reverse displays the Coat of Arms of the Republic of Venda and, around the perimeter beneath, the words "MENDELE WA TSHUVELO KWAYO".

Ribbon

The ribbon is 32 millimetres wide, with a 3 millimetres wide green band, a 2 millimetres wide brown band and a 9 millimetres wide blue band, repeated in reverse order and separated by a 4 millimetres wide white band.

== Discontinuation ==
Conferment of the Distinguished Service Medal, Silver was discontinued when the Republic of Venda ceased to exist on 27 April 1994.
