= Gallantry Cross, Silver =

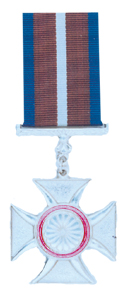
- Type: Military decoration for bravery
- Awarded for: Courage or bravery or valour beyond the normal call of duty
- Country: Venda
- Presented by: the President
- Eligibility: All Ranks
- Post-nominals: GCS
- Status: Discontinued in 1994
- Established: 1985
- Ribbon bar

VDF pre-1994 & SANDF post-2002 orders of wear
- Next (higher): VDF precedence: Gallantry Cross, Gold; SANDF precedence: Honoris Crux (1975)
- Next (lower): VDF succession: Distinguished Service Medal, Gold; SANDF succession: Cross for Bravery

The Gallantry Cross, Silver, post-nominal letters GCS, was instituted by the President of the Republic of Venda in 1985, for award to all ranks for courage or bravery or valour beyond the normal call of duty.

== The Venda Defence Force ==
The 900 member Venda Defence Force (VDF) was established upon that country's independence on 13 September 1979. The Republic of Venda ceased to exist on 27 April 1994 and the Venda Defence Force was amalgamated with six other military forces into the South African National Defence Force (SANDF).

== Institution ==
The Gallantry Cross, Silver was instituted by the President of Venda in 1985. It is the junior award of a set of two decorations for bravery, along with the Gallantry Cross, Gold.

Venda's military decorations and medals were modeled on those of the Republic of South Africa and these two decorations are the approximate equivalents of, respectively, the Louw Wepener Decoration and the Honoris Crux (1975).

== Award criteria ==
The cross could be awarded to all ranks for courage or bravery or valour beyond the normal call of duty.

== Order of wear ==
Since the Gallantry Cross, Silver was authorised for wear by one of the statutory forces which came to be part of the South African National Defence Force on 27 April 1994, it was accorded a position in the official South African order of precedence on that date.

Venda Defence Force until 26 April 1994

- Official VDF order of precedence:
  - Preceded by the Gallantry Cross, Gold (GCG).
  - Succeeded by the Distinguished Service Medal, Gold.
- Venda official national order of precedence:
  - Preceded by the National Force Gallantry Cross, Silver (PCF).
  - Succeeded by the Police Gallantry Cross, Silver (PCF).

South African National Defence Force from 27 April 1994

- Official SANDF order of precedence:
  - Preceded by the Honoris Crux (1975) (HC) of the Republic of South Africa.
  - Succeeded by the Cross for Bravery of the Republic of Transkei.
- Official national order of precedence:
  - Preceded by the Police Insignia for Bravery of the Republic of Ciskei.
  - Succeeded by the Police Gallantry Cross, Silver (PCF) of the Republic of Venda.

The position of the Gallantry Cross, Silver in the official order of precedence was revised twice after 1994, to accommodate the inclusion or institution of new decorations and medals, first in April 1996 when decorations and medals were belatedly instituted for the two former non-statutory forces, the Azanian People's Liberation Army and Umkhonto we Sizwe, and again upon the institution of a new set of honours on 27 April 2003, but it remained unchanged on both occasions.

== Description ==
Obverse

The Gallantry Cross, Silver is a cross pattee, struck in silver, which fits in a circle 45 millimetres in diameter, with a silver hare's bobtail within a red circlet in the centre.

Reverse

The reverse displays the Coat of Arms of the Republic of Venda.

Ribbon

The ribbon is 32 millimetres wide and dark brown, with 4 millimetres wide dark blue edges and a 4 millimetres wide white band in the centre.

== Discontinuation ==
Conferment of the Gallantry Cross, Silver was discontinued when the Republic of Venda ceased to exist on 27 April 1994.
