= Bophuthatswana Air Force =

- Air Force roundel
- Founded: 1987–1994 (disbanded)
- Country: Bophuthatswana
- Branch: Air force
- Role: Air defence
- Size: 17 officers, 8 Senior NCOs, 52 men in 1988

The Bophuthatswana Air Force (BAF) was the aviation branch of the Bophuthatswana Defence Force. The BAF existed from 1987 until 27 April 1994. The primary role of the BAF was to provide support and medevac services to the ground units of the Bophuthatswana army. The BAF operated from several bases, one being Mmabatho AFB.

All surviving aircraft and helicopters were integrated into the South African Air Force after 27 April 1994.

== History ==
An air component of the BDF was established on 19 March 1981 with the purchase of an Alouette III from the South African Police. It was flown by Major De Villiers and Captain LaGrange of the SAAF, with Warrant Officer Strydom, ex-Rhodesian Air Force as Technical officer and Warrant Officer Viljoen of the South West African Police as Gunner and Navigator.

In 1982, the unit became known as Bophuthatswana Air Wing with the arrival of a 2 more Alouette IIIs and 2 Helio H-295s. In 1983, 2 Partenavia P.68s and an AS-355 Écureuil were purchased - the latter was assigned to VIP transports. In November 1989, it was replaced by an SA-365N1 Dauphin.

In 1985, a CASA 212-200 Aviocar was purchased to transport paratroopers, a CASA 212-300 was received in 1987. The 2 Helios were withdrawn from service and replaced by 2 MBB/Kawasaki BK 117s.

With the arrival of so many new aircraft, the Bophuthatswana Air Wing took the name Bophuthatswana Air Force in late 1987. In 1987 it was the first air unit in South Africa to train and commission Black pilot officers.

== Aircraft ==
Aircraft	Origin	Type	In service	Notes
Combat aircraft
Pilatus PC-7	Switzerland	training / COIN	3	
Transport
CASA CN-235	Spain	utility / transport	1	
C.212 Aviocar	Spain	transport	2	
Pilatus PC-6	Switzerland	transport / liaison	1	
Helio Courier	United States	utility / transport	2	
Helicopters
BK 117	Germany	utility / liaison	2	
Alouette III	France	liaison	2	
SA365N Dauphin	France	VIP	2	
