= Medal of Independence =

Medal of Independence may refer to:

- Cross of Independence (Krzyż Niepodległości), one of the highest Polish military decorations between World Wars I and II
- Fiji Independence Medal
- Independence Medal (Lithuania)
- Philippine Independence Medal, a Philippine military decoration awarded to military personnel who had participated in World War II
- Medal of Independence (Turkey) (İstiklal Madalyası), a Turkish decoration for contributions during the Turkish War of Independence
- Medal of Independence (Vietnam), one of the highest Vietnamese decorations since 1947, awarded to Trần Thị Liên
- Zimbabwean Independence Medal, 1980

== See also ==
- Independence Medal (disambiguation)
