= Gallantry Cross, Gold =

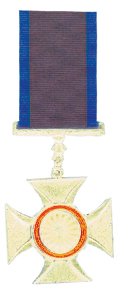
- Type: Military decoration for bravery
- Awarded for: Extreme courage or supreme bravery or valour beyond the normal call of duty
- Country: Venda
- Presented by: the President
- Eligibility: All Ranks
- Post-nominals: GCG
- Status: Discontinued in 1994
- Established: 1985
- Ribbon bar

VDF pre-1994 & SANDF post-2002 orders of wear
- Next (higher): SANDF precedence: Distinguished Gallantry Cross
- Next (lower): VDF succession: Gallantry Cross, Silver; SANDF succession: Honoris Crux (1952)

The Gallantry Cross, Gold was instituted by the President of the Republic of Venda in 1985, for award to all ranks for extreme courage or supreme bravery or valour beyond the normal call of duty.

== The Venda Defence Force ==
The 900 member Venda Defence Force (VDF) was established upon that country's independence on 13 September 1979. The Republic of Venda ceased to exist on 27 April 1994 and the Venda Defence Force was amalgamated with six other military forces into the South African National Defence Force (SANDF).

== Institution ==
The Gallantry Cross, Gold was instituted by the President of Venda in 1985. It is the senior award of a set of two decorations for bravery, along with the Gallantry Cross, Silver.

Venda's military decorations and medals were modelled on those of the Republic of South Africa and these two decorations are the approximate equivalents of, respectively, the Louw Wepener Decoration and the Honoris Crux (1975).

== Award criteria ==
The decoration could be awarded to all ranks for extreme courage or supreme bravery or valour beyond the normal call of duty.

== Order of wear ==
Since the Gallantry Cross, Gold was authorised for wear by one of the statutory forces which came to be part of the South African National Defence Force on 27 April 1994, it was accorded a position in the official South African order of precedence on that date.

Venda Defence Force until 26 April 1994

- Official VDF order of precedence:
  - Succeeded by the Gallantry Cross, Silver (GCS).
- Venda official national order of precedence:
  - Preceded by the National Force Gallantry Cross, Gold (PCF).
  - Succeeded by the Police Gallantry Cross, Gold (PCF).

South African National Defence Force from 27 April 1994

- Official SANDF order of precedence:
  - Preceded by the Distinguished Gallantry Cross of the Republic of Bophuthatswana.
  - Succeeded by the Honoris Crux (1952) (HC) of the Republic of South Africa.
- Official national order of precedence:
  - Preceded by the Decoration for Valour in the Prisons Service of the Republic of Bophuthatswana.
  - Succeeded by the Police Gallantry Cross, Gold (PCF) of the Republic of Venda.

The position of the Gallantry Cross, Gold in the official order of precedence was revised twice after 1994, to accommodate the inclusion or institution of new decorations and medals, but it remained unchanged on both occasions. These were in April 1996, when decorations and medals were belatedly instituted for the two former non-statutory forces, the Azanian People's Liberation Army and Umkhonto we Sizwe, and upon the institution of a new set of honours on 27 April 2003.

== Description ==
Obverse

The Gallantry Cross, Gold is a silver-gilt cross pattee which fits in a circle 45 millimetres in diameter, with a gold hare's bobtail within a red circlet in the centre.

Reverse

The reverse displays the Coat of Arms of the Republic of Venda.

Ribbon

The ribbon is 32 millimetres wide and dark brown, with 4 millimetres wide dark blue edges.

== Discontinuation ==
Conferment of the Gallantry Cross, Gold was discontinued when the Republic of Venda ceased to exist on 27 April 1994.
