= Military Rule Medal =

Military decoration awarded by Transkei

- Type: Military commemorative medal
- Awarded for: Commemoration of the 1987 military coup d'état
- Country: Transkei
- Presented by: the State President
- Eligibility: All ranks
- Status: Discontinued in 1994
- Established: 1987
- Ribbon bar

TDF pre-1994 & SANDF post-2002 orders of wear
- Next (higher): TDF precedence: Independence Medal; SANDF precedence: Independence Medal
- Next (lower): TDF succession: Faithful Service Medal; SANDF succession: Unitas Medal

The Military Rule Medal was instituted by the State President of the Republic of Transkei to commemorate the bloodless 1987 military coup d'état which overthrew the Transkei government on 30 November 1987.

== The Transkei Defence Force ==
The Transkei Defence Force (TDF) was established upon that country's independence on 26 October 1976. The Republic of Transkei ceased to exist on 27 April 1994 and the Transkei Defence Force was amalgamated with six other military forces into the South African National Defence Force (SANDF).

== Coup d'état ==
On 30 November 1987, Major General Bantu Holomisa, the Chief of the Transkei Defence Force, led a bloodless coup d'état against the Transkei government of Prime Minister Stella Sigcau, suspended the civilian constitution and refused South Africa's repeated demands for a return to civilian rule on the grounds that a civilian government would be a puppet controlled by Pretoria.

== Institution ==
The Military Rule Medal was instituted by General Holomisa to commemorate the coup d'état. While the medal is known to have been instituted and awarded, no warrant has yet been traced.

== Award criteria ==
The medal was awarded to all members of the Transkei Defence Force loyal to the military government.

== Order of wear ==
Since the Military Rule Medal was authorised for wear by one of the statutory forces which came to be part of the South African National Defence Force on 27 April 1994, it was accorded a position in the official South African order of precedence on that date.

Transkei Defence Force until 26 April 1994

- Official TDF order of precedence:
  - Preceded by the Independence Medal.
  - Succeeded by the Faithful Service Medal.
- Transkei official national order of precedence:
  - Preceded by the Independence Medal.
  - Succeeded by the Police Faithful Service Medal, 35 Years.

South African National Defence Force from 27 April 1994

- Official SANDF order of precedence:
  - Preceded by the Independence Medal of the Republic of Ciskei.
  - Succeeded by the Unitas Medal of the Republic of South Africa.
- Official national order of precedence:
  - Preceded by the KwaNdebele Police Medal.
  - Succeeded by the Unitas Medal of the Republic of South Africa.

The position of the Military Rule Medal in the order of precedence remained unchanged, as it was on 27 April 1994, when decorations and medals were belatedly instituted in April 1996 for the two former non-statutory forces, the Azanian People's Liberation Army and Umkhonto we Sizwe, and again when a new series of military orders, decorations and medals was instituted in South Africa on 27 April 2003.

== Description ==
Obverse

The Military Rule Medal is a medallion struck in bronze, 38 millimetres in diameter and 3 millimetres thick at the rim, displaying a crossed R1 automatic military rifle and spear, surrounded by a wreath.

Reverse

The reverse displays the Coat of Arms of the Republic of Transkei, with the words "MILITARY RULE MEDAL" around the perimeter above and the date "30:11:1987" around the perimeter below.

Ribbon

The ribbon is 32 millimetres wide and green, with a 2 millimetres wide white band, a 2 millimetres wide brown band and a 2 millimetres wide white band in the centre. Brown, white and green are the colours of the Transkei national flag.

== Discontinuation ==
Conferment of the Transkei Defence Force Medal was discontinued when the Republic of Transkei ceased to exist on 27 April 1994.
