= Venda Defence Force Medal =

- Type: Military decoration for merit
- Awarded for: Service of a high standard
- Country: Venda
- Presented by: the President
- Eligibility: All Ranks
- Status: Discontinued in 1994
- Established: 1984
- Ribbon bar

VDF pre-1994 & SANDF post-2002 orders of wear
- Next (higher): VDF precedence: Distinguished Service Medal, Silver; SANDF precedence: Defence Force Commendation Medal
- Next (lower): VDF succession: General Service Medal; SANDF succession: Marumo Medal, Class II

The Venda Defence Force Medal was instituted by the President of the Republic of Venda in 1984, for award to all ranks for service of a high standard.

== The Venda Defence Force ==
The 900 member Venda Defence Force (VDF) was established upon that country's independence on 13 September 1979. The Republic of Venda ceased to exist on 27 April 1994 and the Venda Defence Force was amalgamated with six other military forces into the South African National Defence Force (SANDF).

== Institution ==
The Venda Defence Force Medal was instituted by the President of Venda in 1984. It is the junior award of a set of three decorations for merit, along with the Distinguished Service Medal, Gold and the Distinguished Service Medal, Silver.

Venda's military decorations and medals were modelled on those of the Republic of South Africa and these three decorations are the approximate equivalents of, respectively, the Southern Cross Decoration and Pro Merito Decoration, the Southern Cross Medal (1975) and Pro Merito Medal (1975), and the Military Merit Medal.

== Award criteria ==
The medal could be awarded to all ranks for service of a high standard.

== Order of wear ==
Since the Venda Defence Force Medal was authorised for wear by one of the statutory forces which came to be part of the South African National Defence Force on 27 April 1994, it was accorded a position in the official South African order of precedence on that date.

Venda Defence Force until 26 April 1994

- Official VDF order of precedence:
  - Preceded by the Distinguished Service Medal, Silver.
  - Succeeded by the General Service Medal.
- Venda official national order of precedence:
  - Preceded by the Department of Prisons Distinguished Service Medal, Silver (SPM).
  - Succeeded by the National Force Medal for Combating Terrorism.

South African National Defence Force from 27 April 1994

- Official SANDF order of precedence:
  - Preceded by the Defence Force Commendation Medal of the Republic of Bophuthatswana.
  - Succeeded by the Marumo Medal, Class II of the Republic of Bophuthatswana.
- Official national order of precedence:
  - Preceded by the Defence Force Commendation Medal of the Republic of Bophuthatswana.
  - Succeeded by the National Intelligence Service Medal for Distinguished Service, Bronze (OOB) of the Republic of South Africa.

The position of the Venda Defence Force Medal in the official order of precedence was revised twice after 1994, to accommodate the inclusion or institution of new decorations and medals, first in April 1996 when decorations and medals were belatedly instituted for the two former non-statutory forces, the Azanian People's Liberation Army and Umkhonto we Sizwe, and again upon the institution of a new set of honours on 27 April 2003, but it remained unchanged on both occasions.

== Description ==
Obverse

The Venda Defence Force Medal is a medallion, struck in bronze and 38 millimetres in diameter, with an elephant's head above an open wreath.

Reverse

The reverse displays the Coat of Arms of the Republic of Venda and, around the perimeter, the words "DEFENCE FORCE MEDAL" at the top and "MENDELE WA MMBI YA VHUPILELI" at the bottom.

Ribbon

The ribbon is 32 millimetres wide, with a 10 millimetres wide red band, a 2 millimetres wide blue band, a 2 millimetres wide green band, a 4 millimetres wide yellow band, a 2 millimetres wide green band, a 2 millimetres wide blue band and a 10 millimetres wide red band.

== Discontinuation ==
Conferment of the Venda Defence Force Medal was discontinued when the Republic of Venda ceased to exist on 27 April 1994.
