= Distinguished Gallantry Medal =

- Type: Military decoration for bravery
- Awarded for: Extraordinary gallantry
- Country: Bophuthatswana
- Presented by: the State President
- Eligibility: All Ranks
- Status: Discontinued in 1994
- Established: 1982
- Ribbon bar

BDF pre-1994 & SANDF post-2002 orders of wear
- Next (higher): BDF precedence: Defence Force Merit Decoration; SANDF precedence: Louw Wepener Medal
- Next (lower): BDF succession: Defence Force Merit Medal; SANDF succession: Nkwe ya Boronse

The Distinguished Gallantry Medal was instituted by the State President of the Republic of Bophuthatswana in 1982, for award to all ranks for extraordinary gallantry.

== The Bophuthatswana Defence Force ==
The Bophuthatswana Defence Force (BDF) was established upon that country's independence on 6 December 1977. The Republic of Bophuthatswana ceased to exist on 27 April 1994 and the Bophuthatswana Defence Force was amalgamated with six other military forces into the South African National Defence Force (SANDF).

== Institution ==
The Distinguished Gallantry Medal was instituted by the State President of Bophuthatswana in 1982. It is the junior award of a set of two decorations for bravery, along with the Distinguished Gallantry Cross.

Bophuthatswana's military decorations and medals were modelled on those of the Republic of South Africa and these two decorations are the approximate equivalents of, respectively, the Louw Wepener Decoration and Louw Wepener Medal.

== Award criteria ==
The medal could be awarded to all ranks for extraordinary gallantry.

== Order of wear ==
Since the Distinguished Gallantry Medal was authorised for wear by one of the statutory forces which came to be part of the South African National Defence Force on 27 April 1994, it was accorded a position in the official South African order of precedence on that date. The position of the Distinguished Gallantry Medal in the official order of precedence was revised on 27 April 2003, to accommodate the institution of a new set of honours.

Bophuthatswana Defence Force until 26 April 1994

- Official BDF order of precedence:
  - Preceded by the Defence Force Merit Decoration.
  - Succeeded by the Defence Force Merit Medal.
- Bophuthatswana official national order of precedence:
  - Preceded by the Order of the Leopard Class IV, Member.
  - Succeeded by the Medal for Valour in the Prisons Service.

South African National Defence Force from 27 April 1994

- Official SANDF order of precedence:
  - Preceded by the Louw Wepener Medal (LWM) of the Republic of South Africa.
  - Succeeded by the Ad Astra Decoration (AAD) of the Republic of South Africa.
- Official national order of precedence:
  - Preceded by the Louw Wepener Medal (LWM) of the Republic of South Africa.
  - Succeeded by the Medal for Valour in the Prisons Service of the Republic of Bophuthatswana.

South African National Defence Force from 27 April 2003

- Official SANDF order of precedence:
  - Preceded by the Louw Wepener Medal (LWM) of the Republic of South Africa.
  - Succeeded by the Nkwe ya Boronse (NB) of the Republic of South Africa.
- Official national order of precedence:
  - Preceded by the Louw Wepener Medal (LWM) of the Republic of South Africa.
  - Succeeded by the Medal for Valour in the Prisons Service of the Republic of Bophuthatswana.

== Description ==
Obverse

The Distinguished Gallantry Medal is a silver-gilt medallion, 38 millimetres in diameter, with a 4 millimetres wide rim and a leopard head on a roundel in the centre, framed in a decorated circle. The suspender is in the shape of buffalo horns.

Reverse

The reverse displays the Coat of Arms of the Republic of Bophuthatswana.

Ribbon

The ribbon is 32 millimetres wide and red, with an 8 millimetres wide green band in the centre.

== Discontinuation ==
Conferment of the Distinguished Gallantry Medal was discontinued when the Republic of Bophuthatswana ceased to exist on 27 April 1994.
