= Transkei Defence Force Medal =

- Type: Military medal for merit
- Country: Transkei
- Presented by: the State President
- Eligibility: All ranks
- Status: Discontinued in 1994
- Established: c. 1976
- Ribbon bar

TDF pre-1994 & SANDF post-2002 orders of wear
- Next (higher): TDF precedence: Cross for Bravery; SANDF precedence: Marumo Medal, Class II
- Next (lower): TDF succession: Independence Medal; SANDF succession: Bronze Medal for Merit

The Transkei Defence Force Medal was instituted by the State President of the Republic of Transkei for award to all ranks as a military medal for merit.

== The Transkei Defence Force ==
The Transkei Defence Force (TDF) was established upon that country's independence on 26 October 1976. The Republic of Transkei ceased to exist on 27 April 1994 and the Transkei Defence Force was amalgamated with six other military forces into the South African National Defence Force (SANDF).

== Institution ==
The Transkei Defence Force Medal was instituted by the State President of Transkei. While the medal is known to have been instituted and awarded, no warrant has yet been traced and, as a result, the date of institution is not known.

== Award criteria ==
The medal could be awarded to all ranks as an honour for military merit. The medal is considered as Transkei's approximate equivalent of South Africa's Military Merit Medal.

== Order of wear ==
Since the Transkei Defence Force Medal was authorised for wear by one of the statutory forces which came to be part of the South African National Defence Force on 27 April 1994, it was accorded a position in the official South African order of precedence on that date. The order of precedence was revised in April 1996, when decorations and medals were belatedly instituted for the two former non-statutory forces, the Azanian People's Liberation Army and Umkhonto we Sizwe.

Transkei Defence Force until 26 April 1994

- Official TDF order of precedence:
  - Preceded by the Cross for Bravery.
  - Succeeded by the Independence Medal.
- Transkei official national order of precedence:
  - Preceded by the Prisons Service Star for Distinction.
  - Succeeded by the Police Medal for Combating Terrorism.

South African National Defence Force from 27 April 1994

- Official SANDF order of precedence:
  - Preceded by the Marumo Medal, Class II of the Republic of Bophuthatswana.
  - Succeeded by the Chief C.D.F. Commendation Medal of the Republic of Ciskei.
- Official national order of precedence:
  - Preceded by the Marumo Medal, Class II of the Republic of Bophuthatswana.
  - Succeeded by the Chief C.D.F. Commendation Medal of the Republic of Ciskei.

South African National Defence Force from April 1996

- Official SANDF order of precedence:
  - Preceded by the Marumo Medal, Class II of the Republic of Bophuthatswana.
  - Succeeded by the Bronze Medal for Merit (BMM) of the Azanian People's Liberation Army.
- Official national order of precedence:
  - Preceded by the Marumo Medal, Class II of the Republic of Bophuthatswana.
  - Succeeded by the Bronze Medal for Merit (BMM) of the Azanian People's Liberation Army.

The position of the Transkei Defence Force Medal in the order of precedence remained unchanged, as it was in April 1996, when a new series of military orders, decorations and medals was instituted in South Africa on 27 April 2003.

== Description ==
Obverse

The Transkei Defence Force Medal is a medallion struck in nickel-silver, 38 millimetres in diameter and 3 millimetres thick at the rim, displaying the official emblem of the Transkei Defence Force.

Reverse

The reverse displays the Coat of Arms of the Republic of Transkei, with the words "TRANSKEI DEFENCE FORCE MEDAL" around the perimeter above.

Ribbon

The ribbon is 32 millimetres wide, with a 4 millimetres wide red band and a 4 millimetres wide white band, repeated in reverse order and separated by a 16 millimetres wide dark blue band.

== Discontinuation ==
Conferment of the Transkei Defence Force Medal was discontinued when the Republic of Transkei ceased to exist on 27 April 1994.
