= Distinguished Service Medal, Gold =

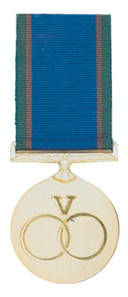
- Type: Military decoration for merit
- Awarded for: Exceptionally meritorious service and particular devotion to duty
- Country: Venda
- Presented by: the President
- Eligibility: All Ranks
- Status: Discontinued in 1994
- Established: 1985
- Ribbon bar

VDF pre-1994 & SANDF post-2002 orders of wear
- Next (higher): VDF precedence: Gallantry Cross, Silver; SANDF precedence: Defence Force Merit Decoration
- Next (lower): VDF succession: Distinguished Service Medal, Silver; SANDF succession: Sandile Decoration

The Distinguished Service Medal, Gold was instituted by the President of the Republic of Venda in 1985, for award to all ranks for exceptionally meritorious service and particular devotion to duty.

== The Venda Defence Force ==
The 900 member Venda Defence Force (VDF) was established upon that country's independence on 13 September 1979. The Republic of Venda ceased to exist on 27 April 1994 and the Venda Defence Force was amalgamated with six other military forces into the South African National Defence Force (SANDF).

== Institution ==
The Distinguished Service Medal, Gold was instituted by the President of Venda in 1985. It is the senior award of a set of three decorations for merit, along with the Distinguished Service Medal, Silver and the Venda Defence Force Medal.

Venda's military decorations and medals were modeled on those of the Republic of South Africa and these three decorations are the approximate equivalents of, respectively, the Southern Cross Decoration and Pro Merito Decoration, the Southern Cross Medal (1975) and Pro Merito Medal (1975), and the Military Merit Medal.

== Award criteria ==
The medal could be awarded to all ranks for exceptionally meritorious service and particular devotion to duty.

== Order of wear ==
Since the Distinguished Service Medal, Gold was authorised for wear by one of the statutory forces which came to be part of the South African National Defence Force on 27 April 1994, it was accorded a position in the official South African order of precedence on that date.

Venda Defence Force until 26 April 1994

- Official VDF order of precedence:
  - Preceded by the Gallantry Cross, Silver (GCS).
  - Succeeded by the Distinguished Service Medal, Silver.
- Venda official national order of precedence:
  - Preceded by the National Force Distinguished Service Medal (SOO).
  - Succeeded by the Police Distinguished Service Decoration (SOO).

South African National Defence Force from 27 April 1994

- Official SANDF order of precedence:
  - Preceded by the Defence Force Merit Decoration of the Republic of Bophuthatswana.
  - Succeeded by the Sandile Decoration (SD) of the Republic of Ciskei.
- Official national order of precedence:
  - Preceded by the Gazankulu Police Star for Distinguished Service.
  - Succeeded by the Police Distinguished Service Decoration (SOO) of the Republic of Venda.

The position of the Distinguished Service Medal, Gold in the official order of precedence was revised twice after 1994, to accommodate the inclusion or institution of new decorations and medals, first in April 1996, when decorations and medals were belatedly instituted for the two former non-statutory forces, the Azanian People's Liberation Army and Umkhonto we Sizwe, and again upon the institution of a new set of honours on 27 April 2003, but it remained unchanged on both occasions.

== Description ==
Obverse

The Distinguished Service Medal, Gold is a silver-gilt medallion, 38 millimetres in diameter, with the letter V above two interlaced rings.

Reverse

The reverse displays the Coat of Arms of the Republic of Venda and, around the perimeter beneath, the words "MENDELE WA TSHUVELO KWAYO".

Ribbon

The ribbon is 32 millimetres wide, with a 3 millimetres wide dark green band, a 2 millimetres wide brown band, a 22 millimetres wide dark blue band, a 2 millimetres wide brown band and a 3 millimetres wide dark green band.

== Discontinuation ==
Conferment of the Distinguished Service Medal, Gold was discontinued when the Republic of Venda ceased to exist on 27 April 1994.
