= Pro Merito Medal (1967) =

- Type: Military decoration for merit
- Awarded for: Outstanding devotion to duty
- Country: South Africa
- Presented by: the State President
- Eligibility: Other ranks
- Post-nominals: PMM
- Status: Discontinued in 1975
- Established: 1967
- First award: 1968
- Final award: 1975

Highlights
- Total: 374
- 1967-1968 and 1968-1975 ribbon bars

SADF pre-1994 & SANDF post-2002 orders of wear
- Next (higher): SADF precedence: Southern Cross Medal (1952); SANDF precedence: Southern Cross Medal (1952)
- Next (lower): SADF succession: Southern Cross Medal (1975); SANDF succession: Distinguished Service Medal, Silver

The Pro Merito Medal of 1967, post-nominal letters PMM, is a military decoration which was instituted by the Republic of South Africa in 1967. It was awarded to other ranks of the South African Defence Force for outstanding devotion to duty and was the non-commissioned officers' version of the Southern Cross Medal of 1952 (SM), which had earlier been available to all ranks.

== The South African military ==
The Union Defence Forces (UDF) were established in 1912 and renamed the South African Defence Force (SADF) in 1958. On 27 April 1994, it was integrated with six other independent forces into the South African National Defence Force (SANDF).

== Institution ==
The Pro Merito Medal of 1967, post-nominal letters PMM, was instituted by the State President on 6 June 1967, as an other ranks' version of the Southern Cross Medal of 1952 (SM), the award of which became restricted to officers with effect from that date.

== Award criteria ==
The medal could be awarded to other ranks of the South African Defence Force for outstanding devotion to duty. Prior to the institution of the Pro Merito Medal, other ranks had been eligible for the award of the Southern Cross Medal.

== Order of wear ==
The position of the Pro Merito Medal of 1967 in the official order of precedence was revised three times after 1975, to accommodate the inclusion or institution of new decorations and medals, first upon the integration into the South African National Defence Force on 27 April 1994, again when decorations and medals were belatedly instituted in April 1996 for the two former non-statutory forces, the Azanian People's Liberation Army and Umkhonto we Sizwe, and again when a new series of military orders, decorations and medals was instituted in South Africa on 27 April 2003. The position of the Pro Merito Medal of 1967 remained unchanged, as it was on 27 April 1994, upon the latter two occasions

South African Defence Force until 26 April 1994

- Official SADF order of precedence:
  - Preceded by the Southern Cross Medal (1952) (SM).
  - Succeeded by the Southern Cross Medal (1975) (SM).
- Official national order of precedence:
  - Preceded by the Southern Cross Medal (1952) (SM).
  - Succeeded by the Police Star for Outstanding Service (SOE).

South African National Defence Force from 27 April 1994

- Official SANDF order of precedence:
  - Preceded by the Southern Cross Medal (1952) (SM) of the Republic of South Africa.
  - Succeeded by the Distinguished Service Medal, Silver of the Republic of Venda.
- Official national order of precedence:
  - Preceded by the Southern Cross Medal (1952) (SM) of the Republic of South Africa.
  - Succeeded by the Police Star for Outstanding Service (SOE) of the Republic of South Africa.

== Description ==
Obverse

The Pro Merito Medal of 1967 is a medallion, struck in silver, 38 millimetres in diameter and 3 millimetres thick, depicting disa uniflora framed in a wreath of protea flowers.

Reverse

The reverse has the embossed pre-1994 South African Coat of Arms, with the decoration number impressed at the bottom of the decoration on the rim.

Ribbons

The original ribbon was 32 millimetres wide with dark blue, orange, white and dark blue bands, all 3¼ millimetres wide, and an orange band, 1½ millimetres wide, repeated in reverse order and separated by a white band in the centre, 3 millimetres wide. Because it was so similar in appearance to the ribbon of the Permanent Force Good Service Medal, however, it was replaced by a new ribbon, announced in Government Gazette No. 2047 dated 19 April 1968.

The new ribbon was 32 millimetres wide and sky blue, divided in the centre by five bands of orange, white, dark blue, white and orange, the dark blue band 3 millimetres wide and the other four all 1½ millimetres wide.

== Discontinuation ==
Conferment of the decoration was discontinued in respect of services performed on or after 1 July 1975, when the Pro Merito Medal (1975) was instituted to replace it.
