= Distinguished Gallantry Cross =

- Type: Military decoration for bravery
- Awarded for: Hair-raising deeds of distinguished heroism
- Country: Bophuthatswana
- Presented by: the State President
- Eligibility: All Ranks
- Status: Discontinued in 1994
- Established: 1982
- Ribbon bar

BDF pre-1994 & SANDF post-2002 orders of wear
- Next (higher): BDF precedence: Order of the Leopard, Military Division, Commander; SANDF precedence: Louw Wepener Decoration
- Next (lower): BDF succession: Defence Force Merit Decoration; SANDF succession: Gallantry Cross, Gold

The Distinguished Gallantry Cross was instituted by the State President of the Republic of Bophuthatswana in 1982, for award to all ranks for hair-raising deeds of distinguished heroism.

== The Bophuthatswana Defence Force ==
The Bophuthatswana Defence Force (BDF) was established upon that country's independence on 6 December 1977. The Republic of Bophuthatswana ceased to exist on 27 April 1994 and the Bophuthatswana Defence Force was amalgamated with six other military forces into the South African National Defence Force (SANDF).

== Institution ==
The Distinguished Gallantry Cross was instituted by the State President of Bophuthatswana in 1982. It is the senior award of a set of two decorations for bravery, along with the Distinguished Gallantry Medal.

Bophuthatswana's military decorations and medals were modelled on those of the Republic of South Africa and these two decorations are the approximate equivalents of, respectively, the Louw Wepener Decoration and Louw Wepener Medal.

== Award criteria ==
The decoration could be awarded to all ranks for hair-raising deeds of distinguished heroism. Only one DGC was ever awarded, to General Jack Turner, for his heroic action and who was shot in the ankle, while overpowering and disarming a rebel guard, saving President Lucas Mangope's life and other captured officials from being executed during the attempted coup, on 10 February 1988.

== Order of wear ==
Since the Distinguished Gallantry Cross was authorised for wear by one of the statutory forces which came to be part of the South African National Defence Force on 27 April 1994, it was accorded a position in the official South African order of precedence on that date.

Bophuthatswana Defence Force until 26 April 1994

- Official BDF order of precedence:
  - Preceded by the Order of the Leopard, Military Division, Commander.
  - Succeeded by the Defence Force Merit Decoration.
- Bophuthatswana official national order of precedence:
  - Preceded by the Order of the Leopard, Military Division, Commander.
  - Succeeded by the Decoration for Valour in the Prisons Service.

South African National Defence Force from 27 April 1994

- Official SANDF order of precedence:
  - Preceded by the Louw Wepener Decoration (LWD) of the Republic of South Africa.
  - Succeeded by the Gallantry Cross, Gold (GCG) of the Republic of Venda.
- Official national order of precedence:
  - Preceded by the National Force Gallantry Cross, Gold (PCF) of the Republic of Venda.
  - Succeeded by the King's Cross for Bravery of the KwaZulu Homeland.

The position of the Distinguished Gallantry Cross in the official order of precedence was revised twice after 1994, to accommodate the inclusion or institution of new decorations and medals, but it remained unchanged on both occasions. These occurred in April 1996, when decorations and medals were belatedly instituted for the two former non-statutory forces, the Azanian People's Liberation Army and Umkhonto we Sizwe, and upon the institution of a new set of honours on 27 April 2003.

== Description ==
Obverse

The Distinguished Gallantry Cross is a silver-gilt cross, 38 millimetres in diameter, with dark green enamelled arms and a double-bladed axe head between each pair of arms. In the centre is a leopard head on a red enameled roundel. The suspender is attached to the cross by another double-bladed axe head symbol.

Reverse

The reverse displays the Coat of Arms of the Republic of Bophuthatswana.

Ribbon

The ribbon is 32 millimetres wide and dark red.

== Discontinuation ==
Conferment of the Distinguished Gallantry Cross was discontinued when the Republic of Bophuthatswana ceased to exist on 27 April 1994.
