= Independence Medal (Transkei) =

- Type: Military commemorative medal
- Awarded for: Commemoration of the independence of Transkei
- Country: Transkei
- Presented by: the State President
- Eligibility: All ranks
- Status: Discontinued in 1976
- Established: c. 1976
- Ribbon bar

TDF pre-1994 & SANDF post-2002 orders of wear
- Next (higher): TDF precedence: Defence Force Medal; SANDF precedence: Queen Elizabeth II Coronation Medal
- Next (lower): TDF succession: Military Rule Medal; SANDF succession: Independence Medal (Bophuthatswana)

The Independence Medal was instituted by the State President of the Republic of Transkei to commemorate Independence on 26 October 1976. It was awarded to all ranks on the active strength of the Transkei Defence Force upon independence.

== The Transkei Defence Force ==
The Transkei Defence Force (TDF) was established upon that country's independence on 26 October 1976. The Republic of Transkei ceased to exist on 27 April 1994 and the Transkei Defence Force was amalgamated with six other military forces into the South African National Defence Force (SANDF).

== Institution ==
The Independence Medal was instituted by the State President of Transkei on 26 October 1976, to commemorate the independence of the Republic of Transkei. While the medal is known to have been instituted and awarded, no warrant has yet been traced.

== Award criteria ==
The medal was awarded to all ranks who were on the active strength of the Transkei Defence Force upon independence, including members on detached duty from the South African Defence Force.

== Order of wear ==
Since the Independence Medal was authorised for wear by one of the statutory forces which came to be part of the South African National Defence Force on 27 April 1994, it was accorded a position in the official South African order of precedence on that date.

Transkei Defence Force until 26 April 1994

- Official TDF order of precedence:
  - Preceded by the Defence Force Medal.
  - Succeeded by the Military Rule Medal.
- Transkei official national order of precedence:
  - Preceded by the Police Medal for Combating Terrorism.
  - Succeeded by the Military Rule Medal.

South African National Defence Force from 27 April 1994

- Official SANDF order of precedence:
  - Preceded by the Queen Elizabeth II Coronation Medal of the United Kingdom.
  - Succeeded by the Independence Medal of the Republic of Bophuthatswana.
- Official national order of precedence:
  - Preceded by the Queen Elizabeth II Coronation Medal of the United Kingdom.
  - Succeeded by the Independence Medal of the Republic of Bophuthatswana.

The position of the Independence Medal in the order of precedence remained unchanged, as it was on 27 April 1994, when decorations and medals were belatedly instituted in April 1996 for the two former non-statutory forces, the Azanian People's Liberation Army and Umkhonto we Sizwe, and again when a new series of military orders, decorations and medals was instituted in South Africa on 27 April 2003.

== Description ==
Obverse

The Independence Medal is a medallion struck in bronze, 38 millimetres in diameter and 3 millimetres thick at the raised rim, displaying the Coat of Arms of the Republic of Transkei.

Reverse

The reverse is plain with a raised rim and is inscribed "UZIMELE" and "26•10•76" in two lines.

Ribbon

The ribbon is 32 millimetres wide, with a 4 millimetres wide brown band and a 4 millimetres wide white band, repeated in reverse order and separated by a 16 millimetres wide green band. Brown, white and green are the colours of the national flag of Transkei.

== Discontinuation ==
Conferment of the Independence Medal was discontinued in 1976.
