= Independence Medal (Venda) =

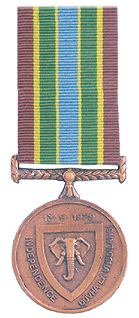
- Type: Military commemorative medal
- Awarded for: Commemoration of the independence of Venda
- Country: Venda
- Presented by: the President
- Eligibility: All Ranks
- Status: Discontinued in 1994
- Established: 1979
- First award: 1979
- Final award: 1979
- Ribbon bar

VDF pre-1994 & SANDF post-2002 orders of wear
- Next (higher): VDF precedence: General Service Medal (Venda); SANDF precedence: Independence Medal (Bophuthatswana)
- Next (lower): VDF succession: Long Service Medal, Gold; SANDF succession: Independence Medal (Ciskei)

The Independence Medal was instituted by the President of the Republic of Venda in 1979, for award to all ranks in commemoration of the independence of Venda.

== The Venda Defence Force ==
The 900 member Venda Defence Force (VDF) was established upon that country's independence on 13 September 1979. The Republic of Venda ceased to exist on 27 April 1994 and the Venda Defence Force was amalgamated with six other military forces into the South African National Defence Force (SANDF).

== Institution ==
The Independence Medal was instituted by the President of Venda in 1979.

== Award criteria ==
The medal was awarded to all ranks in commemoration of the independence of Venda.

== Order of wear ==
Since the Independence Medal was authorised for wear by one of the statutory forces which came to be part of the South African National Defence Force on 27 April 1994, it was accorded a position in the official South African order of precedence on that date.

Venda Defence Force until 26 April 1994

- Official VDF order of precedence:
  - Preceded by the General Service Medal.
  - Succeeded by the Long Service Medal, Gold.
- Venda official national order of precedence:
  - Preceded by the Police Medal for Combating Terrorism.
  - Succeeded by the Police Establishment Medal.

South African National Defence Force from 27 April 1994

- Official SANDF order of precedence:
  - Preceded by the Independence Medal of the Republic of Bophuthatswana.
  - Succeeded by the Independence Medal of the Republic of Ciskei.
- Official national order of precedence:
  - Preceded by the Independence Police Medal of the Republic of Bophuthatswana.
  - Succeeded by the Police Establishment Medal of the KwaZulu Homeland.

The position of the Independence Medal in the official order of precedence was revised twice after 1994, to accommodate the inclusion or institution of new decorations and medals, first in April 1996 when decorations and medals were belatedly instituted for the two former non-statutory forces, the Azanian People's Liberation Army and Umkhonto we Sizwe, and again upon the institution of a new set of honours on 27 April 2003, but it remained unchanged on both occasions.

== Description ==
Obverse

The Independence Medal is a medallion struck in copper, 38 millimetres in diameter, depicting an elephant's head on a shield and inscribed "13 9 1979" above, "INDEPENDENCE" to the left and "DUVHA LA VHUDILANG" to the right of the shield.

Reverse

The reverse displays the Coat of Arms of the Republic of Venda.

Ribbon

The ribbon is 32 millimetres wide, with a 5 millimetres wide brown band, a 2 millimetres wide yellow band, a 5 millimetres wide green band and a 1 millimetre wide yellow band, repeated in reverse order and separated by a 6 millimetres wide blue band.

== Discontinuation ==
Conferment of the Independence Medal was discontinued when the Republic of Venda ceased to exist on 27 April 1994.
