= Ciskei Defence Medal =

- Type: Military campaign medal
- Awarded for: General service
- Country: Ciskei
- Presented by: the President
- Eligibility: All Ranks
- Status: Discontinued in 1994
- Established: 1988
- Ribbon bar

CDF pre-1994 & SANDF post-2002 orders of wear
- Next (higher): CDF precedence: Chief C.D.F. Commendation Medal; SANDF precedence: General Service Medal
- Next (lower): CDF succession: Independence Medal; SANDF succession: Nkwe Medal

The Ciskei Defence Medal was instituted by the President of the Republic of Ciskei in 1988, for award to all ranks for general service.

== The Ciskei Defence Force ==
The Ciskei Defence Force (CDF) was established upon that country's independence on 4 December 1981. The Republic of Ciskei ceased to exist on 27 April 1994 and the Ciskei Defence Force was amalgamated with six other military forces into the South African National Defence Force (SANDF).

== Institution ==
The Ciskei Defence Medal was instituted by the President of Ciskei in 1988.

== Award criteria ==
The medal is a campaign medal which could be awarded to all ranks for general service.

== Order of wear ==
Since the Ciskei Defence Medal was authorised for wear by one of the statutory forces which came to be part of the South African National Defence Force on 27 April 1994, it was accorded a position in the official South African order of precedence on that date.

Ciskei Defence Force until 26 April 1994

- Official CDF order of precedence:
  - Preceded by the Chief C.D.F. Commendation Medal.
  - Succeeded by the Independence Medal.
- Ciskei official national order of precedence:
  - Preceded by the Police Medal for Maintenance of Law and Order.
  - Succeeded by the Independence Medal.

South African National Defence Force from 27 April 1994

- Official SANDF order of precedence:
  - Preceded by the General Service Medal of the Republic of South Africa.
  - Succeeded by the Nkwe Medal of the Republic of Bophuthatswana.
- Official national order of precedence:
  - Preceded by the General Service Medal of the Republic of South Africa.
  - Succeeded by the Nkwe Medal of the Republic of Bophuthatswana.

The position of the Ciskei Defence Medal in the official order of precedence was revised twice after 1994, to accommodate the inclusion or institution of new decorations and medals, first in April 1996 when decorations and medals were belatedly instituted for the two former non-statutory forces, the Azanian People's Liberation Army and Umkhonto we Sizwe, and again upon the institution of a new set of honours on 27 April 2003, but it remained unchanged on both occasions.

== Description ==
Obverse

The Ciskei Defence Medal is a medallion struck in bronze, 38 millimetres in diameter, displaying a Xhosa shield on a crossed spear and knobkierie between two sprays of leaves.

Reverse

The reverse displays the Coat of Arms of the Republic of Ciskei, with the inscriptions "IMBASA YOMKHOSI" above and "DEFENCE MEDAL" below.

Ribbon

The ribbon is 32 millimetres wide, with a 10 millimetres wide blue band and a 4 millimetres wide white band, repeated in reverse order and separated by a 4 millimetres wide black band in the centre.

== Discontinuation ==
Conferment of the Ciskei Defence Medal was discontinued when the Republic of Ciskei ceased to exist on 27 April 1994.
