= Marumo Medal, Class I =

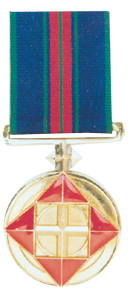
- Type: Military decoration for merit
- Country: Bophuthatswana
- Presented by: the State President
- Status: Discontinued in 1994
- Established: 1988
- Ribbon bar

BDF pre-1994 & SANDF post-2002 orders of wear
- Next (higher): BDF precedence: Defence Force Merit Medal; SANDF precedence: Sandile Medal
- Next (lower): BDF succession: Defence Force Commendation Medal; SANDF succession: Merit Medal in Silver

The Marumo Medal, Class I was instituted by the State President of the Republic of Bophuthatswana in 1988.

== The Bophuthatswana Defence Force ==
The Bophuthatswana Defence Force (BDF) was established upon that country's independence on 6 December 1977. The Republic of Bophuthatswana ceased to exist on 27 April 1994 and the Bophuthatswana Defence Force was amalgamated with six other military forces into the South African National Defence Force (SANDF).

== Institution ==
The Marumo Medal, Class I was instituted by the State President of Bophuthatswana in 1988. It is the senior award of a set of two, along with the Marumo Medal, Class II.

"Marumo" can be translated as "fight" or "fighting", adopted into SeTswana from a command used by Shaka Zulu.

== Award criteria ==
The medal could be awarded for merit in action.

== Order of wear ==
Since the Marumo Medal, Class I was authorised for wear by one of the statutory forces which came to be part of the South African National Defence Force on 27 April 1994, it was accorded a position in the official South African order of precedence on that date. The position of the Marumo Medal, Class I in the official order of precedence was revised twice after 1994, to accommodate the inclusion or institution of new decorations and medals, first in April 1996, when decorations and medals were belatedly instituted for the two former non-statutory forces, the Azanian People's Liberation Army and Umkhonto we Sizwe, and again upon the institution of a new set of honours on 27 April 2003.

Bophuthatswana Defence Force until 26 April 1994

- Official BDF order of precedence:
  - Preceded by the Defence Force Merit Medal.
  - Succeeded by the Defence Force Commendation Medal.
- Bophuthatswana official national order of precedence:
  - Preceded by the Medal for Merit in the Prisons Service.
  - Succeeded by the Police Decoration for Distinguished Service (TK).

South African National Defence Force from 27 April 1994

- Official SANDF order of precedence:
  - Preceded by the Sandile Medal (SM) of the Republic of Ciskei.
  - Succeeded by the Danie Theron Medal (DTM) of the Republic of South Africa.
- Official national order of precedence:
  - Preceded by the Prisons Service Star for Merit (PSM) of the Republic of Ciskei.
  - Succeeded by the KwaZulu Department of Correctional Services Star for Merit, Officers (SPM).

South African National Defence Force from April 1996

- Official SANDF order of precedence:
  - Preceded by the Sandile Medal (SM) of the Republic of Ciskei.
  - Succeeded by the Merit Medal in Silver (MMS) of Umkhonto we Sizwe.
- Official national order of precedence:
  - Preceded by the Prisons Service Star for Merit (PSM) of the Republic of Ciskei.
  - Succeeded by the KwaZulu Department of Correctional Services Star for Merit, Officers (SPM).

The position of the Marumo Medal, Class I in the order of precedence remained unchanged, as it was in April 1996, when a new series of military orders, decorations and medals was instituted in South Africa on 27 April 2003.

== Description ==
Obverse

The Marumo Medal, Class I is a silver-gilt medallion, 38 millimetres in diameter and 3 millimetres thick at the rim, with an encircled gold cross in a square in the centre, surrounded by eight red enameled triangles, the whole depicting four red-tipped arrows arranged as a cross.

Reverse

The reverse has the Coat of Arms of the Republic of Bophuthatswana.

Ribbon

The ribbon is 32 millimetres wide, with a 2 millimetres wide green band, a 9 millimetres wide dark blue band, a 1 millimetre wide green band, a 1 millimetre wide dark blue band and a 2½ millimetres wide dark red band, repeated in reverse order and separated by a 1 millimetre wide green band in the centre.

== Discontinuation ==
Conferment of the Marumo Medal, Class I was discontinued when the Republic of Bophuthatswana ceased to exist on 27 April 1994.
