= Cross for Bravery =

- Type: Military decoration for bravery
- Awarded for: Bravery
- Country: Transkei
- Presented by: the State President
- Eligibility: All ranks
- Status: Discontinued in 1994
- Established: c. 1976
- Ribbon bar

TDF pre-1994 & SANDF post-2002 orders of wear
- Next (higher): SANDF precedence: Gallantry Cross, Silver
- Next (lower): TDF succession: Defence Force Medal; SANDF succession: Bravery Star in Silver

The Cross for Bravery was instituted by the State President of the Republic of Transkei, for award to all ranks as a decoration for bravery.

== The Transkei Defence Force ==
The Transkei Defence Force (TDF) was established upon that country's independence on 26 October 1976. The Republic of Transkei ceased to exist on 27 April 1994 and the Transkei Defence Force was amalgamated with six other military forces into the South African National Defence Force (SANDF).

== Institution ==
The Cross for Bravery was instituted by the State President of Transkei. While the decoration is known to have been instituted and possibly awarded, no warrant has yet been traced and, as a result, the exact date of institution is not known. The decoration is considered as Transkei's approximate equivalent of South Africa's Honoris Crux (1975).

== Award criteria ==
The decoration could be awarded to all ranks as a military decoration for bravery.

== Order of wear ==
Since the Cross for Bravery was authorised for wear by one of the statutory forces which came to be part of the South African National Defence Force on 27 April 1994, it was accorded a position in the official South African order of precedence on that date. The order of precedence was revised in April 1996, when decorations and medals were belatedly instituted for the two former non-statutory forces, the Azanian People's Liberation Army and Umkhonto we Sizwe.

Transkei Defence Force until 26 April 1994

- Official TDF order of precedence:
  - Succeeded by the Defence Force Medal.
- Transkei official national order of precedence:
  - Preceded by the Prisons Service Gallantry Cross.
  - Succeeded by the Order of Transkei, Class IV, Officer (OT).

South African National Defence Force from 27 April 1994

- Official SANDF order of precedence:
  - Preceded by the Gallantry Cross, Silver (GCS) of the Republic of Venda.
  - Succeeded by the Pro Virtute Decoration (PVD) of the Republic of South Africa.
- Official national order of precedence:
  - Preceded by the KwaZulu Department of Correctional Services Cross for Gallantry (CPV).
  - Succeeded by the Civil Defence Medal for Bravery of the Republic of South Africa.

South African National Defence Force from April 1996

- Official SANDF order of precedence:
  - Preceded by the Gallantry Cross, Silver (GCS) of the Republic of Venda.
  - Succeeded by the Bravery Star in Silver (BSS) of the Azanian People's Liberation Army.
- Official national order of precedence:
  - Preceded by the KwaZulu Department of Correctional Services Cross for Gallantry (CPV).
  - Succeeded by the Civil Defence Medal for Bravery of the Republic of South Africa.

The position of the Cross for Bravery in the order of precedence remained unchanged, as it was in April 1996, when a new series of military orders, decorations and medals was instituted in South Africa on 27 April 2003.

== Description ==
Obverse

The Cross for Bravery is a convex cross, struck in silver and 38 millimetres in diameter, displaying in the centre a blue crane inside a red roundel, which is inscribed "FOR BRAVERY" at the top and has a wreath of leaves at the bottom.

Reverse

The reverse displays the Coat of Arms of the Republic of Transkei.

Ribbon

The ribbon is 32 millimetres wide and red, with a 2 millimetres wide white band 2 millimetres from each edge.

== Discontinuation ==
Conferment of the Cross for Bravery was discontinued when the Republic of Transkei ceased to exist on 27 April 1994.
