= Independence Medal (Ciskei) =

- Type: Military commemorative medal
- Awarded for: Commemoration of the independence of Ciskei
- Country: Ciskei
- Presented by: the President
- Eligibility: All Ranks
- Status: Discontinued in 1981
- Established: 1981
- Ribbon bar

CDF pre-1994 & SANDF post-2002 orders of wear
- Next (higher): CDF precedence: Ciskei Defence Medal; SANDF precedence: Independence Medal (Venda)
- Next (lower): CDF succession: Medal for Long Service, Bronze; SANDF succession: Military Rule Medal

The Independence Medal was instituted by the President of the Republic of Ciskei in 1981, for award to all serving members of the Ciskei Defence Force on 4 December 1981 to commemorate the independence of Ciskei.

== The Ciskei Defence Force ==
The Ciskei Defence Force (CDF) was established upon that country's independence on 4 December 1981. The Republic of Ciskei ceased to exist on 27 April 1994 and the Ciskei Defence Force was amalgamated with six other military forces into the South African National Defence Force (SANDF).

== Institution ==
The Independence Medal was instituted by the President of Ciskei in 1981.

== Award criteria ==
The medal was awarded to all members serving in the Ciskei Defence Force on 4 December 1981, to commemorate the independence of Ciskei.

== Order of wear ==
Since the Independence Medal was authorised for wear by one of the statutory forces which came to be part of the South African National Defence Force on 27 April 1994, it was accorded a position in the official South African order of precedence on that date.

Ciskei Defence Force until 26 April 1994

- Official CDF order of precedence:
  - Preceded by the Ciskei Defence Medal.
  - Succeeded by the Medal for Long Service, Bronze.
- Ciskei official national order of precedence:
  - Preceded by the Ciskei Defence Medal.
  - Succeeded by the Police Insignia for Merit.

South African National Defence Force from 27 April 1994

- Official SANDF order of precedence:
  - Preceded by the Independence Medal of the Republic of Venda.
  - Succeeded by the Military Rule Medal of the Republic of Transkei.
- Official national order of precedence:
  - Preceded by the Police Establishment Medal of the Gazankulu Homeland.
  - Succeeded by the Police Foundation Medal of the Qwaqwa Homeland.

The position of the Independence Medal in the official order of precedence was revised twice after 1994, to accommodate the inclusion or institution of new decorations and medals, first in April 1996 when decorations and medals were belatedly instituted for the two former non-statutory forces, the Azanian People's Liberation Army and Umkhonto we Sizwe, and again upon the institution of a new set of honours on 27 April 2003. It remained unchanged on both occasions.

== Description ==
Obverse

The Independence Medal is a disk struck in copper, 38 millimetres in diameter, displaying a blue crane on a crossed spear and knobkierie, framed inside a double circle which is inscribed "IXKULULEKO" at left, "CISKEI" at the top, "INDEPENDENCE" at right and "4 DISEMBA 1981" below.

Ribbon

The ribbon is 32 millimetres wide, with a 4 millimetres wide brown band, a 4 millimetres wide green band and a 4 millimetres wide blue band, repeated in reverse order and separated by an 8 millimetres wide white band in the centre.

== Discontinuation ==
Conferment of the Independence Medal was discontinued in 1981.
