= Sandile Medal =

- Type: Military decoration for merit
- Awarded for: Meritorious service
- Country: Ciskei
- Presented by: the President
- Eligibility: All Ranks
- Post-nominals: SM
- Status: Discontinued in 1994
- Established: 1988
- Ribbon bar

CDF pre-1994 & SANDF post-2002 orders of wear
- Next (higher): CDF precedence: Cross for Bravery; SANDF precedence: Defence Force Merit Medal
- Next (lower): CDF succession: Pro Merito Decoration; SANDF succession: Marumo Medal, Class I

The Sandile Medal was instituted by the President of the Republic of Ciskei in 1988, for award to all ranks for meritorious service.

== The Ciskei Defence Force ==
The Ciskei Defence Force (CDF) was established upon that country's independence on 4 December 1981. The Republic of Ciskei ceased to exist on 27 April 1994 and the Ciskei Defence Force was amalgamated with six other military forces into the South African National Defence Force (SANDF).

== Institution ==
The Sandile Medal, post-nominal letters SM, was instituted by the President of Ciskei in 1988. It is the middle award of a set of three decorations for merit, along with the Sandile Decoration and the Chief C.D.F. Commendation Medal.

Ciskei's military decorations and medals were modelled on those of the Republic of South Africa and these three decorations are the approximate equivalents of, respectively, the Southern Cross Decoration and Pro Merito Decoration, the Southern Cross Medal (1975) and Pro Merito Medal (1975), and the Military Merit Medal.

The medal was named after King Sandile kaNgqika, who had been declared as deposed and a fugitive by Major General Sir Henry George Wakelyn Smith Bt GCB, Governor and Commander-in-Chief of the Cape of Good Hope, after he refused to attend a meeting with Smith outside Fort Cox in December 1850. Sandile subsequently besieged the fort and the 8th Cape Frontier War broke out, the longest and bloodiest of the frontier wars.

== Award criteria ==
The medal could be awarded to all ranks for meritorious service.

== Order of wear ==
Since the Sandile Medal was authorised for wear by one of the statutory forces which came to be part of the South African National Defence Force on 27 April 1994, it was accorded a position in the official South African order of precedence on that date.

Ciskei Defence Force until 26 April 1994

- Official CDF order of precedence:

  - Preceded by the Cross for Bravery (CCB).
  - Succeeded by the Pro Merito Decoration (PMD).
- Ciskei official national order of precedence:
  - Preceded by the Prisons Service Star for Distinction (PSD).
  - Succeeded by the Prisons Service Star for Merit (PSM).

South African National Defence Force from 27 April 1994

- Official SANDF order of precedence:
  - Preceded by the Defence Force Merit Medal of the Republic of Bophuthatswana.
  - Succeeded by the Marumo Medal, Class I of the Republic of Bophuthatswana.
- Official national order of precedence:
  - Preceded by the Medal for Merit in the Prisons Service of the Republic of Bophuthatswana.
  - Succeeded by the Prisons Service Star for Merit (PSM) of the Republic of Ciskei.

The position of the Sandile Medal in the official order of precedence was revised twice after 1994, to accommodate the inclusion or institution of new decorations and medals, first in April 1996 when decorations and medals were belatedly instituted for the two former non-statutory forces, the Azanian People's Liberation Army and Umkhonto we Sizwe, and again upon the institution of a new set of honours on 27 April 2003. On both occasions, it remained unchanged, as it was on 27 April 1994.

== Description ==
Obverse

The Sandile Medal is a medallion struck in silver, 38 millimetres in diameter and without a raised rim, displaying the eagle emblem of the Ciskei Defence Force in a laurel wreath.

Reverse

The reverse, also without a raised rim, displays the Coat of Arms of the Republic of Ciskei, with the silver hallmark impressed beneath.

Ribbon

The ribbon is 32 millimetres wide, with a 5 millimetres wide red band and a 9 millimetres wide white band, repeated in reverse order and separated by a 4 millimetres wide green band in the centre.

== Discontinuation ==
Conferment of the Sandile Medal was discontinued when the Republic of Ciskei ceased to exist on 27 April 1994.

== See also ==
- Sir Harry Smith's Medal for Gallantry
