= Defence Force Commendation Medal =

- Type: Military decoration for merit
- Awarded for: Service of a high standard
- Country: Bophuthatswana
- Presented by: the State President
- Eligibility: All Ranks
- Status: Discontinued in 1994
- Established: 1982
- Ribbon bar

BDF pre-1994 & SANDF post-2002 orders of wear
- Next (higher): BDF precedence: Marumo Medal, Class I; SANDF precedence: Military Merit Medal
- Next (lower): BDF succession: Marumo Medal, Class II; SANDF succession: Defence Force Medal

The Defence Force Commendation Medal was instituted by the State President of the Republic of Bophuthatswana in 1982. It could be awarded to all ranks for service of a high standard.

== The Bophuthatswana Defence Force ==
The Bophuthatswana Defence Force (BDF) was established upon that country's independence on 6 December 1977. The Republic of Bophuthatswana ceased to exist on 27 April 1994 and the Bophuthatswana Defence Force was amalgamated with six other military forces into the South African National Defence Force (SANDF).

== Institution ==
The Defence Force Commendation Medal was instituted by the State President of Bophuthatswana in 1982. It is the junior award of a set of three decorations for merit, along with the Defence Force Merit Decoration and the Defence Force Merit Medal.

Bophuthatswana's military decorations and medals were modelled on those of the Republic of South Africa and these three decorations are the approximate equivalents of, respectively, the Southern Cross Decoration and Pro Merito Decoration, the Southern Cross Medal (1975) and Pro Merito Medal (1975), and the Military Merit Medal.

== Award criteria ==
The medal could be awarded to all ranks for service of a high standard.

== Order of wear ==
Since the Defence Force Commendation Medal was authorised for wear by one of the statutory forces which came to be part of the South African National Defence Force on 27 April 1994, it was accorded a position in the official South African order of precedence on that date.

Bophuthatswana Defence Force until 26 April 1994

- Official BDF order of precedence:
  - Preceded by the Marumo Medal, Class I.
  - Succeeded by the Marumo Medal, Class II.
- Bophuthatswana official national order of precedence:
  - Preceded by the Medal of the Order of the Leopard.
  - Succeeded by the Marumo Medal, Class II.

South African National Defence Force from 27 April 1994

- Official SANDF order of precedence:
  - Preceded by the Military Merit Medal (MMM) of the Republic of South Africa.
  - Succeeded by the Defence Force Medal of the Republic of Venda.
- Official national order of precedence:
  - Preceded by the National Intelligence Service Decoration, Bronze of the Republic of South Africa.
  - Succeeded by the Defence Force Medal of the Republic of Venda.

The position of the Defence Force Commendation Medal in the order of precedence remained unchanged, as it was on 27 April 1994, when decorations and medals were belatedly instituted in April 1996 for the two former non-statutory forces, the Azanian People's Liberation Army and Umkhonto we Sizwe, and again when a new series of military orders, decorations and medals was instituted in South Africa on 27 April 2003.

== Description ==
Obverse

The Defence Force Commendation Medal is a medallion struck in bronze, 38 millimetres in diameter, with an encircled leopard head in the centre and four double-ended arrow symbols around the perimeter. The undecorated suspender is attached to the medal by a double-ended arrow symbol beneath four converging lines.

Reverse

The reverse displays the Coat of Arms of the Republic of Bophuthatswana.

Ribbon

The ribbon is 32 millimetres wide and cobalt blue, with two 4 millimetres wide yellow bands in the centre, spaced 8 millimetres apart.

== Discontinuation ==
Conferment of the Defence Force Commendation Medal was discontinued when the Republic of Bophuthatswana ceased to exist on 27 April 1994.
