= Defence Force Merit Decoration =

- Type: Military decoration for merit
- Awarded for: Distinguished service of high quality and utmost devotion to duty
- Country: Bophuthatswana
- Presented by: the State President
- Eligibility: Officers
- Status: Discontinued in 1994
- Established: 1982
- Ribbon bar

BDF pre-1994 & SANDF post-2002 orders of wear
- Next (higher): BDF precedence: Distinguished Gallantry Cross; SANDF precedence: Star for Conspicuous Leadership
- Next (lower): BDF succession: Distinguished Gallantry Medal; SANDF succession: Distinguished Service Medal, Gold

The Defence Force Merit Decoration was instituted by the State President of the Republic of Bophuthatswana in 1982, for award to officers for distinguished service of high quality and utmost devotion to duty.

== The Bophuthatswana Defence Force ==
The Bophuthatswana Defence Force (BDF) was established upon that country's independence on 6 December 1977. The Republic of Bophuthatswana ceased to exist on 27 April 1994 and the Bophuthatswana Defence Force was amalgamated with six other military forces into the South African National Defence Force (SANDF).

== Institution ==
The Defence Force Merit Decoration was instituted by the State President of Bophuthatswana in 1982. It is the senior award of a set of three decorations for merit, along with the Defence Force Merit Medal and the Defence Force Commendation Medal.

Bophuthatswana's military decorations and medals were modeled on those of the Republic of South Africa and these three decorations are the approximate equivalents of, respectively, the Southern Cross Decoration and Pro Merito Decoration, the Southern Cross Medal (1975) and Pro Merito Medal (1975), and the Military Merit Medal.

== Award criteria ==
The decoration could be awarded to officers for distinguished service of high quality and utmost devotion to duty.

== Order of wear ==
Since the Defence Force Merit Decoration was authorised for wear by one of the statutory forces which came to be part of the South African National Defence Force on 27 April 1994, it was accorded a position in the official South African order of precedence on that date. The position of the Defence Force Merit Decoration in the official order of precedence was revised twice after 1994, to accommodate the inclusion or institution of new decorations and medals, first in April 1996 when decorations and medals were belatedly instituted for the two former non-statutory forces, the Azanian People's Liberation Army and Umkhonto we Sizwe, and again upon the institution of a new set of honours on 27 April 2003.

Bophuthatswana Defence Force until 26 April 1994

- Official BDF order of precedence:
  - Preceded by the Distinguished Gallantry Cross.
  - Succeeded by the Distinguished Gallantry Medal.
- Bophuthatswana official national order of precedence:
  - Preceded by the Police Cross for Bravery (RYGT).
  - Succeeded by the Decoration for Merit in the Prisons Service.

South African National Defence Force from 27 April 1994

- Official SANDF order of precedence:
  - Preceded by the Pro Merito Decoration (PMD) of the Republic of South Africa.
  - Succeeded by the Distinguished Service Medal, Gold of the Republic of Venda.
- Official national order of precedence:
  - Preceded by the civilian version of the Sandile Decoration (SD) of the Republic of Ciskei.
  - Succeeded by the Decoration for Merit in the Prisons Service of the Republic of Bophuthatswana.

South African National Defence Force from April 1996

- Official SANDF order of precedence:
  - Preceded by the Star for Conspicuous Leadership (SCL) of the Azanian People's Liberation Army.
  - Succeeded by the Distinguished Service Medal, Gold of the Republic of Venda.
- Official national order of precedence:
  - Preceded by the civilian version of the Sandile Decoration (SD) of the Republic of Ciskei.
  - Succeeded by the Decoration for Merit in the Prisons Service of the Republic of Bophuthatswana.

The position of the Defence Force Merit Decoration in the order of precedence remained unchanged, as it was in April 1996, when a new series of military orders, decorations and medals was instituted in South Africa on 27 April 2003.

== Description ==
Obverse

The Defence Force Merit Decoration is an inverted five-pointed star, struck in silver, to fit inside a circle 38 millimetres in diameter, with three rays between each pair of star points and with a silver leopard head on a light blue enameled roundel in the centre.

Reverse

The reverse displays the Coat of Arms of the Republic of Bophuthatswana.

Ribbon

The ribbon is 32 millimetres wide and cobalt blue.

== Discontinuation ==
Conferment of the Defence Force Merit Decoration was discontinued when the Republic of Bophuthatswana ceased to exist on 27 April 1994.
