= Nkwe Medal =

- Type: Military campaign medal
- Awarded for: Operational service
- Country: Bophuthatswana
- Presented by: the State President
- Eligibility: All ranks
- Status: Discontinued in 1994
- Established: 1990
- Ribbon bar

BDF pre-1994 & SANDF post-2002 orders of wear
- Next (higher): BDF precedence: Marumo Medal, Class II; SANDF precedence: Defence Medal
- Next (lower): BDF succession: General Service Medal; SANDF succession: General Service Medal

The Nkwe Medal (Leopard medal) was instituted by the State President of the Republic of Bophuthatswana in 1990, for award to all ranks for operational service.

== The Bophuthatswana Defence Force ==
The Bophuthatswana Defence Force (BDF) was established upon that country's independence on 6 December 1977. The Republic of Bophuthatswana ceased to exist on 27 April 1994 and the Bophuthatswana Defence Force was amalgamated with six other military forces into the South African National Defence Force (SANDF).

== Institution ==
The Nkwe Medal (Leopard Medal) was instituted by the State President of Bophuthatswana in 1990.

== Award criteria ==
The medal could be awarded to all ranks for operational service.

== Order of wear ==
Since the Nkwe Medal was authorised for wear by one of the statutory forces which came to be part of the South African National Defence Force on 27 April 1994, it was accorded a position in the official South African order of precedence on that date.

Bophuthatswana Defence Force until 26 April 1994

- Official BDF order of precedence:
  - Preceded by the Marumo Medal, Class II.
  - Succeeded by the General Service Medal.
- Bophuthatswana official national order of precedence:
  - Preceded by the Police Medal for Combating Terrorism.
  - Succeeded by the General Service Medal.

South African National Defence Force from 27 April 1994

- Official SANDF order of precedence:
  - Preceded by the Defence Medal of the Republic of Ciskei.
  - Succeeded by the General Service Medal of the Republic of Bophuthatswana.
- Official national order of precedence:
  - Preceded by the Defence Medal of the Republic of Ciskei.
  - Succeeded by the General Service Medal of the Republic of Bophuthatswana.

The position of the Nkwe Medal in the order of precedence remained unchanged, as it was on 27 April 1994, when decorations and medals were belatedly instituted in April 1996 for the two former non-statutory forces, the Azanian People's Liberation Army and Umkhonto we Sizwe, and again when a new series of military orders, decorations and medals was instituted in South Africa on 27 April 2003.

== Description ==
Obverse

The Nkwe Medal is an octagonal medal, struck in nickel-silver and 3 millimetres thick at the rim, to fit inside a circle 38 millimetres in diameter. It depicts a prowling leopard.

Reverse

The reverse has the Coat of Arms of the Republic of Bophuthatswana with the medal number impressed below. The reverse of the suspender is undecorated.

Ribbon

The ribbon is 32 millimetres wide, with a 4 millimetres wide red band, a 2 millimetres wide white band and a 4 millimetres wide red band, repeated and separated by a 12 millimetres wide dark yellow band in the centre.

== Discontinuation ==
Conferment of the Nkwe Medal was discontinued when the Republic of Bophuthatswana ceased to exist on 27 April 1994.
