= Marumo Medal, Class II =

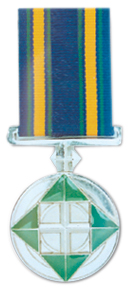
- Type: Military decoration for merit
- Country: Bophuthatswana
- Presented by: the State President
- Status: Discontinued in 1994
- Established: 1988
- Ribbon bar

BDF pre-1994 & SANDF post-2002 orders of wear
- Next (higher): BDF precedence: Defence Force Commendation Medal; SANDF precedence: Defence Force Medal
- Next (lower): BDF succession: Nkwe Medal; SANDF succession: Defence Force Medal

The Marumo Medal, Class II was instituted by the State President of the Republic of Bophuthatswana in 1988.

== The Bophuthatswana Defence Force ==
The Bophuthatswana Defence Force (BDF) was established upon that country's independence on 6 December 1977. The Republic of Bophuthatswana ceased to exist on 27 April 1994 and the Bophuthatswana Defence Force was amalgamated with six other military forces into the South African National Defence Force (SANDF).

== Institution ==
The Marumo Medal, Class II was instituted by the State President of Bophuthatswana in 1988. It is the junior award of a set of two, along with the Marumo Medal, Class I.

"Marumo" can be translated as "fight" or "fighting", adopted into Setswana from a command used by Shaka Zulu.

== Award criteria ==
The medal could be awarded for merit in action.

== Order of wear ==
Since the Marumo Medal, Class II was authorised for wear by one of the statutory forces which came to be part of the South African National Defence Force on 27 April 1994, it was accorded a position in the official South African order of precedence on that date.

Bophuthatswana Defence Force until 26 April 1994

- Official BDF order of precedence:
  - Preceded by the Defence Force Commendation Medal.
  - Succeeded by the Nkwe Medal.
- Bophuthatswana official national order of precedence:
  - Preceded by the Defence Force Commendation Medal.
  - Succeeded by the Police Medal for Combating Terrorism.

South African National Defence Force from 27 April 1994

- Official SANDF order of precedence:
  - Preceded by the Defence Force Medal of the Republic of Venda.
  - Succeeded by the Defence Force Medal of the Republic of Transkei.
- Official national order of precedence:
  - Preceded by the Prisons Service Commendation Medal of the Republic of Ciskei.
  - Succeeded by the Defence Force Medal of the Republic of Transkei.

The position of the Marumo Medal, Class II in the order of precedence remained unchanged, as it was on 27 April 1994, when decorations and medals were belatedly instituted in April 1996 for the two former non-statutory forces, the Azanian People's Liberation Army and Umkhonto we Sizwe, and again when a new series of military orders, decorations and medals was instituted in South Africa on 27 April 2003.

== Description ==
Obverse

The Marumo Medal, Class II is a medallion struck in silver, 38 millimetres in diameter and 3 millimetres thick at the rim, with an encircled silver cross in a square frame in the centre, surrounded by eight green enameled triangles, the whole depicting four green-tipped arrows or spears arranged as a cross.

Reverse

The reverse has the Coat of Arms of the Republic of Bophuthatswana.

Ribbon

The ribbon is 32 millimetres wide and cobalt blue, with two three-coloured bands, spaced 10 millimetres apart and 3 millimetres from each edge, each consisting of a 1 millimetre wide green band, a 1 millimetre wide cobalt blue band, a 4 millimetres wide yellow band, a 1 millimetre wide cobalt blue band and a 1 millimetre wide green band.

== Discontinuation ==
Conferment of the Marumo Medal, Class II was discontinued when the Republic of Bophuthatswana ceased to exist on 27 April 1994.
