= General Service Medal (Bophuthatswana) =

- Type: Military campaign medal
- Awarded for: Operational service inside Bophuthatswana
- Country: Bophuthatswana
- Presented by: the State President
- Eligibility: All ranks
- Status: Discontinued in 1994
- Established: 1991
- Ribbon bar

BDF pre-1994 & SANDF post-2002 orders of wear
- Next (higher): BDF precedence: Nkwe Medal; SANDF precedence: Nkwe Medal
- Next (lower): BDF succession: Independence Medal; SANDF succession: Operational Medal for Southern Africa

The General Service Medal was instituted by the State President of the Republic of Bophuthatswana in 1991, for award to all ranks for operational service inside Bophuthatswana.

== The Bophuthatswana Defence Force ==
The Bophuthatswana Defence Force (BDF) was established upon that country's independence on 6 December 1977. The Republic of Bophuthatswana ceased to exist on 27 April 1994 and the Bophuthatswana Defence Force was amalgamated with six other military forces into the South African National Defence Force (SANDF).

== Institution ==
The General Service Medal was instituted by the State President of Bophuthatswana in 1991.

== Award criteria ==
The medal could be awarded to all ranks for operational service inside Bophuthatswana.

== Order of wear ==
Since the General Service Medal was authorised for wear by one of the statutory forces which came to be part of the South African National Defence Force on 27 April 1994, it was accorded a position in the official South African order of precedence on that date. The position of the General Service Medal in the official order of precedence was revised twice after 1994, to accommodate the inclusion or institution of new decorations and medals, first in April 1996 when decorations and medals were belatedly instituted for the two former non-statutory forces, the Azanian People's Liberation Army and Umkhonto we Sizwe, and again upon the institution of a new set of honours on 27 April 2003.

Bophuthatswana Defence Force until 26 April 1994

- Official BDF order of precedence:
  - Preceded by the Nkwe Medal.
  - Succeeded by the Independence Medal.
- Bophuthatswana official national order of precedence:
  - Preceded by the Nkwe Medal.
  - Succeeded by the Independence Medal.

South African National Defence Force from 27 April 1994

- Official SANDF order of precedence:
  - Preceded by the Nkwe Medal of the Republic of Bophuthatswana.
  - Succeeded by the Queen Elizabeth II Coronation Medal of the United Kingdom.
- Official national order of precedence:
  - Preceded by the Nkwe Medal of the Republic of Bophuthatswana.
  - Succeeded by the Queen Elizabeth II Coronation Medal of the United Kingdom.

South African National Defence Force from April 1996

- Official SANDF order of precedence:
  - Preceded by the Nkwe Medal of the Republic of Bophuthatswana.
  - Succeeded by the Operational Medal for Southern Africa of Umkhonto we Sizwe and the Azanian People's Liberation Army.
- Official national order of precedence:
  - Preceded by the Nkwe Medal of the Republic of Bophuthatswana.
  - Succeeded by the Operational Medal for Southern Africa of Umkhonto we Sizwe and the Azanian People's Liberation Army.

The position of the General Service Medal in the order of precedence remained unchanged, as it was in April 1996, when a new series of military orders, decorations and medals was instituted in South Africa on 27 April 2003.

== Description ==
Obverse

The General Service Medal is a medallion struck in nickel-silver, 38 millimetres in diameter and 3 millimetres thick at the rim, displaying the leopard emblem of the Bophuthatswana Defence Force surrounded by a laurel wreath.

Reverse

The reverse has the Coat of Arms of the Republic of Bophuthatswana.

Ribbon

The ribbon is 32 millimetres wide, with a 4 millimetres wide yellow band, a 2 millimetres wide red band and a 4 millimetres wide white band, repeated in reverse order and separated by a 12 millimetres wide red band in the centre.

== Discontinuation ==
Conferment of the General Service Medal was discontinued when the Republic of Bophuthatswana ceased to exist on 27 April 1994.
