= Louw Wepener Medal =

- Type: Military decoration for bravery
- Awarded for: Courageous or heroic deeds in saving lives
- Country: South Africa
- Presented by: the State President
- Eligibility: All Ranks
- Post-nominals: LWM
- Clasps: Bar for subsequent award
- Status: Discontinued in 1975
- Established: 1967
- First award: 1969
- Final award: 1975

Highlights
- Total: 8
- Ribbon bar

SADF pre-1994 & SANDF post-2002 orders of wear
- Next (higher): SADF precedence: Van Riebeeck Medal; SANDF precedence: Van Riebeeck Medal
- Next (lower): SADF succession: Pro Virtute Medal; SANDF succession: Distinguished Gallantry Medal

The Louw Wepener Medal, post-nominal letters LWM, is a South African military decoration for bravery which was instituted by the Republic of South Africa on 20 October 1967. It was awarded to members of the South African Defence Force for courageous or heroic deeds in saving lives. The Louw Wepener Medal was discontinued on 1 July 1975, when a new set of decorations and medals was instituted.

== The South African military ==
The Union Defence Forces (UDF) were established in 1912 and renamed the South African Defence Force (SADF) in 1958. On 27 April 1994, it was integrated with six other independent forces into the South African National Defence Force (SANDF).

== Institution ==
The Louw Wepener Medal, post-nominal letters LWM, was instituted by the State President on 20 October 1967, as a second-level military decoration for bravery in addition to the existing Louw Wepener Decoration. The awards were named in honour of Louw Wepener who, in 1865, lost his life whilst leading his burghers in an attack on a Basotho stronghold on Thaba Bosigo, during the Basuto Wars of 1858 to 1865.

== Award criteria ==
The Medal could be awarded to all ranks of the South African Defence Force, or serving with or rendering service to the Defence Force, for courageous or heroic deeds of self-sacrifice in saving lives in the presence of personal danger, or deeds performed in the execution of or beyond the call of military duty and for which other purely military awards were not normally made. A Bar could be awarded for a further similar deed of bravery.

Only eight awards were made, the first in 1969 and the last in 1975. No bar to the decoration was ever awarded.

== Order of wear ==
The position of the Louw Wepener Medal in the official order of precedence was revised twice after 1975, to accommodate the inclusion or institution of new decorations and medals, first upon the integration into the South African National Defence Force in 1994 and again upon the institution of a new set of awards in 2003.

South African Defence Force until 26 April 1994

- Official SADF order of precedence:
  - Preceded by the Van Riebeeck Medal (VRM).
  - Succeeded by the Pro Virtute Medal (PVM).
- Official national order of precedence:
  - Preceded by the Van Riebeeck Medal (VRM).
  - Succeeded by the Pro Virtute Medal (PVM).

South African National Defence Force from 27 April 1994

- Official SANDF order of precedence:
  - Preceded by the Van Riebeeck Medal (VRM) of the Republic of South Africa.
  - Succeeded by the Distinguished Gallantry Medal of the Republic of Bophuthatswana.
- Official national order of precedence:
  - Preceded by the Van Riebeeck Medal (VRM) of the Republic of South Africa.
  - Succeeded by the Distinguished Gallantry Medal of the Republic of Bophuthatswana.

The position of the Louw Wepener Medal in the order of precedence remained unchanged, as it was on 27 April 1994, when decorations and medals were belatedly instituted in April 1996 for the two former non-statutory forces, the Azanian People's Liberation Army and Umkhonto we Sizwe, and again when a new series of military orders, decorations and medals was instituted in South Africa on 27 April 2003.

== Description ==
Obverse

The Louw Wepener Medal is a bronze medallion, 38 millimetres in diameter, which depicts the mountain peak of Thaba Bosigo, with two men on horseback in the foreground. Below the horsemen are the words "THABA BOSIGO, 1865" and around the circumference are the words "LOUW WEPENER" at the top and "MEDALJE : MEDAL" at the bottom.

Reverse

The reverse has the pre-1994 South African Coat of Arms, with the decoration number impressed at the bottom on the rim.

Ribbon

The ribbon is 1 3/8 inches (35 millimetres) wide and orange, with four white bands, all 1/16 inch (1.6 millimetres) wide and spaced 7/32 inch (5.6 millimetres) apart.

Bar

The bar is 1 3/8 inches (35 millimetres) wide and in bronze, with the encircled letters "LWM" in the centre. When only ribbon bars are worn, a recipient of a subsequent award would have worn a bronze button with the encircled letters "LWD", 8 millimetres (0.31 inches) in diameter, on the ribbon bar.

== Discontinuation ==
Conferment of the decoration was discontinued in respect of services performed on or after 1 July 1975, when a new set of decorations and medals was instituted.

== Recipients ==
LWM no.	Name	Rank	Service Arm	Unit	Date awarded
	Godfrey, E.J.J. (Note: Godfrey, E.J.J. – Gunner Godfrey saved someone from drowning in the sea.)	Gnr	SA Army	SAA	12 Sep 1969
	Nell, D.H.	S Sgt	SA Army	SSB	6 Aug 1971
	Froneman, J.J.	Sea	SA Navy		Oct 1971
	Lamont, J.F. (Note: Lamont, J.F. – Leading Seaman Lamont rescued a crewmate from heavy seas.)	LS	SA Navy	SAS EH	25 Aug 1972
	Swanepoel, M.P.P. (Note: Swanepoel, M.P.P. – Leading Seaman Swanepoel rescued an unconscious man from a fire.)	LS	SA Navy		25 Aug 1972
	Meyer, J.J.	Sgt	SA Army	Hoëveld	28 Jun 1974
	Blaauw, D.I.	2 Lt	SA Army	1 PB	6 Jun 1975
	Marrs, S.B. (Note: Marrs, S.B. – Sapper Marrs rescued a woman and her child, who had fallen overboard from a pont into a crocodile-infested river.)	Spr	SA Army		6 Jun 1975

=== Actions cited for ===
e. Meyer, JJ - Sergt Johannes Jogemus MEYER, Regiment Highveld, Awarded for rescuing a fellow soldier from drowning in the crocodile infested waters of the Kavango River, South West Africa (1 Military Area Rundu) on 22 April 1972. Medal numbered 10.
