= Defence Force Merit Medal =

- Type: Military decoration for merit
- Awarded for: Extraordinarily excellent service and particular devotion to duty
- Country: Bophuthatswana
- Presented by: the State President
- Eligibility: All Ranks
- Status: Discontinued in 1994
- Established: 1982
- Ribbon bar

BDF pre-1994 & SANDF post-2002 orders of wear
- Next (higher): BDF precedence: Distinguished Gallantry Medal; SANDF precedence: Pro Merito Medal (1975)
- Next (lower): BDF succession: Marumo Medal, Class I; SANDF succession: Sandile Medal

The Defence Force Merit Medal was instituted by the State President of the Republic of Bophuthatswana in 1982, for award to all ranks for extraordinarily excellent service and particular devotion to duty.

== The Bophuthatswana Defence Force ==
The Bophuthatswana Defence Force (BDF) was established upon that country's independence on 6 December 1977. The Republic of Bophuthatswana ceased to exist on 27 April 1994 and the Bophuthatswana Defence Force was amalgamated with six other military forces into the South African National Defence Force (SANDF).

== Institution ==
The Defence Force Merit Medal was instituted by the State President of Bophuthatswana in 1982. It is the middle award of a set of three decorations for merit, along with the Defence Force Merit Decoration and the Defence Force Commendation Medal.

Bophuthatswana's military decorations and medals were modeled on those of the Republic of South Africa and these three decorations are the approximate equivalents of, respectively, the Southern Cross Decoration and Pro Merito Decoration, the Southern Cross Medal (1975) and Pro Merito Medal (1975), and the Military Merit Medal.

== Award criteria ==
The medal could be awarded to all ranks for extraordinarily excellent service and particular devotion to duty.

== Order of wear ==
Since the Defence Force Merit Medal was authorised for wear by one of the statutory forces which came to be part of the South African National Defence Force on 27 April 1994, it was accorded a position in the official South African order of precedence on that date.

Bophuthatswana Defence Force until 26 April 1994

- Official BDF order of precedence:
  - Preceded by the Distinguished Gallantry Medal.
  - Succeeded by the Marumo Medal, Class I.
- Bophuthatswana official national order of precedence:
  - Preceded by the Medal for Valour in the Prisons Service.
  - Succeeded by the Medal for Merit in the Prisons Service.

South African National Defence Force from 27 April 1994

- Official SANDF order of precedence:
  - Preceded by the Pro Merito Medal (1975) (PMM) of the Republic of South Africa.
  - Succeeded by the Sandile Medal (SM) of the Republic of Ciskei.
- Official national order of precedence:
  - Preceded by the National Intelligence Service Decoration, Silver of the Republic of South Africa.
  - Succeeded by the Medal for Merit in the Prisons Service of the Republic of Bophuthatswana.

The position of the Defence Force Merit Medal in the order of precedence remained unchanged, as it was on 27 April 1994, when decorations and medals were belatedly instituted in April 1996 for the two former non-statutory forces, the Azanian People's Liberation Army and Umkhonto we Sizwe, and again when a new series of military orders, decorations and medals was instituted in South Africa on 27 April 2003.

== Description ==
Obverse

The Defence Force Merit Medal is a medallion struck in silver, 38 millimetres in diameter, with a six-pointed star with three rays between each pair of star points, surmounted by a silver leopard head on a light blue enamelled roundel in the centre.

Reverse

The reverse displays the Coat of Arms of the Republic of Bophuthatswana.

Ribbon

The ribbon is 32 millimetres wide and cobalt blue, 32 millimetres wide, with a 12 millimetres wide dark blue band, an 8 millimetres wide dark yellow band and a 12 millimetres wide dark blue band.

== Discontinuation ==
Conferment of the Defence Force Merit Medal was discontinued when the Republic of Bophuthatswana ceased to exist on 27 April 1994.
