= Independence Medal (Bophuthatswana) =

- Type: Military commemorative medal
- Awarded for: Commemoration of the independence of Bophuthatswana
- Country: Bophuthatswana
- Presented by: the State President
- Eligibility: All ranks
- Status: Discontinued in 1977
- Established: 1977
- Ribbon bar

BDF pre-1994 & SANDF post-2002 orders of wear
- Next (higher): BDF precedence: General Service Medal; SANDF precedence: Independence Medal
- Next (lower): BDF succession: Medal for Long Service and Good Conduct, Gold; SANDF succession: Independence Medal

The Independence Medal was instituted by the State President of the Republic of Bophuthatswana to commemorate that country's independence on 6 December 1977. It was awarded to all ranks on the active strength of the Bophuthatswana Defence Force upon independence.

== The Bophuthatswana Defence Force ==
The Bophuthatswana Defence Force (BDF) was established upon that country's independence on 6 December 1977. The Republic of Bophuthatswana ceased to exist on 27 April 1994 and the Bophuthatswana Defence Force was amalgamated with six other military forces into the South African National Defence Force (SANDF).

== Institution ==
The Independence Medal was instituted by the State President of Bophuthatswana to commemorate the independence of the Republic of Bophuthatswana on 6 December 1977.

== Award criteria ==
The medal was awarded to all ranks who were on the active strength of the Bophuthatswana Defence Force upon independence, including members on detached duty from the South African Defence Force. While the medal is known to have been instituted and awarded, no warrant has yet been traced.

== Order of wear ==
Since the Independence Medal was authorised for wear by one of the statutory forces which came to be part of the South African National Defence Force on 27 April 1994, it was accorded a position in the official South African order of precedence on that date.

Bophuthatswana Defence Force until 26 April 1994

- Official BDF order of precedence:
  - Preceded by the General Service Medal.
  - Succeeded by the Medal for Long Service and Good Conduct, Gold.
- Bophuthatswana official national order of precedence:
  - Preceded by the General Service Medal.
  - Succeeded by the Independence Police Medal.

South African National Defence Force from 27 April 1994

- Official SANDF order of precedence:
  - Preceded by the Independence Medal of the Republic of Transkei.
  - Succeeded by the Independence Medal of the Republic of Venda.
- Official national order of precedence:
  - Preceded by the Independence Medal of the Republic of Transkei.
  - Succeeded by the Independence Police Medal of the Republic of Bophuthatswana.

The position of the Independence Medal in the order of precedence remained unchanged, as it was on 27 April 1994, when decorations and medals were belatedly instituted in April 1996 for the two former non-statutory forces, the Azanian People's Liberation Army and Umkhonto we Sizwe, and again when a new series of military orders, decorations and medals was instituted in South Africa on 27 April 2003.

== Description ==
Obverse

The Independence Medal is a gilt disk, 38 millimetres in diameter and 3 millimetres thick at the rim, displaying the Coat of Arms of the Republic of Bophuthatswana in colour on a white enameled background.

Reverse

The reverse shows the face of a leopard over the inscription "6-12-77", the date of Bophuthatswana's independence.

Ribbon

The ribbon is 32 millimetres wide, with a 3 millimetres wide red band, an 8 millimetres wide cobalt blue band, a 4 millimetres wide dark yellow (cadmium) band, repeated in reverse order and separated by a 2 millimetres wide green band. Cobalt blue and cadmium are the principal colours of the national flag of Bophuthatswana.

== Discontinuation ==
Conferment of the Independence Medal was discontinued in 1977.
