= Louw Wepener Decoration =

Former South African military decoration

- Type: Military decoration for bravery
- Awarded for: Acts of the most conspicuous courage or greatest heroism
- Country: South Africa
- Presented by: the Monarch of the United Kingdom and the Commonwealth realms and, from 1961, the State President
- Eligibility: All Ranks
- Post-nominals: LWD
- Clasps: Bar for subsequent award
- Status: Discontinued in 1975
- Established: 1952
- First award: 1961
- Final award: 1974

Highlights
- Total: 7
- Total awarded posthumously: 2
- Ribbon bar

SADF pre-1994 & SANDF post-2002 orders of wear
- Next (higher): SADF precedence: Star of South Africa; SANDF precedence: Star of South Africa
- Next (lower): SADF succession: Honoris Crux (1952); SANDF succession: Distinguished Gallantry Cross

The Louw Wepener Decoration, post-nominal letters LWD, is a military decoration for bravery which was instituted by the Union of South Africa in 1952. It was awarded to members of the South African Defence Force for acts of the most conspicuous courage or greatest heroism. The decoration was discontinued on 1 July 1975, when a new set of decorations and medals was instituted.

== The South African military ==
The Union Defence Forces (UDF) were established in 1912 and renamed the South African Defence Force (SADF) in 1958. On 27 April 1994, it was integrated with six other independent forces into the South African National Defence Force (SANDF).

== Institution ==
The Louw Wepener Decoration, post-nominal letters LWD, was instituted by Queen Elizabeth II on 6 April 1952, during the Tercentenary Van Riebeeck Festival. From 1967, it was the senior of a set of two decorations for bravery, along with the Louw Wepener Medal which was instituted in that year.

== Award criteria ==
The Louw Wepener Decoration could be awarded to all ranks for acts of most conspicuous courage or the greatest heroism in circumstances of great danger, and was primarily a non-combat decoration. A Bar could be awarded for a further similar deed of bravery. The decoration was instituted in honour of Louw Wepener who, in 1865, lost his life whilst leading his burghers in an attack on a Basotho stronghold on Thaba Bosigo, during the Basuto Wars of 1858 to 1865.

Only seven awards were made, the first in 1961 and the last in 1974. No bar to the decoration was ever awarded.

== Order of wear ==
With effect from 6 April 1952, when the Louw Wepener Decoration and several other new decorations and medals were instituted, these new awards took precedence before all earlier British decorations and medals awarded to South Africans, with the exception of the Victoria Cross, which still took precedence before all other awards. The other older British awards continued to be worn in the order prescribed by the British Central Chancery of the Orders of Knighthood.

The position of the Louw Wepener Decoration in the official order of precedence was revised to accommodate the inclusion of the decorations and medals of Transkei, Bophuthatswana, Venda and Ciskei, upon their integration into the South African National Defence Force in 1994.

South African Defence Force until 26 April 1994

- Official SADF order of precedence:
  - Preceded by the Star of South Africa (SSA).
  - Succeeded by the Honoris Crux (1952) (HC).
- Official national order of precedence:
  - Preceded by the National Intelligence Service Decoration for Distinguished Leadership (OD).
  - Succeeded by the Woltemade Decoration for Bravery, Silver (WDS).

South African National Defence Force from 27 April 1994

- Official SANDF order of precedence:
  - Preceded by the Star of South Africa (SSA) of the Republic of South Africa.
  - Succeeded by the Distinguished Gallantry Cross of the Republic of Bophuthatswana.
- Official national order of precedence:
  - Preceded by the Department of Correctional Services Star of Excellence (SPA) of the KwaZulu Homeland.
  - Succeeded by the Woltemade Decoration for Bravery, Silver (WDS) of the Republic of South Africa.

The position of the Louw Wepener Decoration in the order of wear remained unchanged, as it was on 27 April 1994, when decorations and medals were instituted for Umkhonto we Sizwe and the Azanian People's Liberation Army in April 1996, and when a new series of military orders, decorations and medals was instituted on 27 April 2003.

== Description ==
Obverse

The Louw Wepener Decoration is a silver medallion, 38 millimetres in diameter, which depicts the mountain peak of Thaba Bosigo, with two men on horseback at its foot. Below the horsemen are the words "THABA BOSIGO, 1865" and around the circumference are the words "LOUW WEPENER" at the top and "DECORATION • DEKORASIE" at the bottom.

Reverse

The reverse has the pre-1994 South African coat of arms, with the decoration number impressed at the bottom on the rim. Specimens which were minted and awarded before South Africa became a republic on 31 May 1961, had Queen Elizabeth's royal cipher (E II R) above the coat of arms.

Ribbon

The ribbon is 1 3/8 inches (35 millimetres) wide and orange, with five white bands, all 1/8 inch (3.2 millimetres) wide and spaced 1/8 inch (3.2 millimetres) apart.

Bar

The bar, to denote a subsequent award of the decoration, is 1 3/8 inches (35 millimetres) wide and in silver, with the encircled letters "LWD" in the centre. When only ribbon bars are worn, a recipient of a subsequent award would have worn a silver button with the encircled letters "LWD", 8 millimetres (0.31 inches) in diameter, on the ribbon bar.

== Discontinuation ==
Conferment of the decoration was discontinued in respect of services performed on or after 1 July 1975, when a new set of decorations and medals was instituted.

== Recipients ==
LWD no.	Name	Rank	Service Arm	Unit	Date awarded
	Nel, D.vZ. (Note: Nel & Van Aswegen – Lieutenant Nel and Sergeant van Aswegen climbed aboard a burning armoured car at a public event, to rescue the crew and extinguish the fire to prevent an explosion.)	2 Lt	SA Army	SSB	19 May 1961
	van Aswegen, W.A.G. (Willem)	Sgt	SA Army	SSB	19 May 1961
	Stephens, F.P. (Note: Stephens, F.P. – Sergeant Stephens defused an explosive device which had been placed on a railway line.)	Sgt	SA Army	SACMP	1 Nov 1963
	van Wyk, H.H. (Note: Van Wyk – Rifleman van Wyk jumped onto the wing of an incoming light aircraft with a damaged wheel to help the pilot land safely.)	Rfn	SA Army	1 SAI	1 Nov 1963
	van Heerden, J.H. (Note: Van Heerden – Commandant van Heerden picked up and tossed a live grenade clear of a training group, at risk of his own life.)	Cmdt	SA Army	Middle Karoo Commando	15 Aug 1969
	Britz, J.P. † (Note: Britz – Major Britz prevented his stricken Sabre fighter aircraft from crashing into a built-up area in Pietersburg, by staying at the controls instead of ejecting by parachute.)	Maj	SAAF	1 Sqn	19 Mar 1970
	Zeelie, F.J. † (Note: Zeelie – Lieutenant Zeelie single-handedly stormed an enemy position. He was the first SADF casualty in combat in the 1966-1989 Border War.)	Lt	SA Army	1 RR	6 Dec 1974

Note 1: † denotes a posthumous award.
