= Nkwe ya Boronse =

South African military bravery medal

Nkwe ya Boronse Bronze Leopard
- Type: Military decoration for bravery
- Awarded for: Acts of bravery during military operations or exceptional combat leadership
- Country: South Africa
- Presented by: the President
- Eligibility: All ranks
- Post-nominals: NB
- Status: Current
- Established: 27 April 2003
- First award: 2008

Highlights
- Total: 14
- Total awarded posthumously: 3
- Ribbon bar

Order of wear
- Next (higher): Distinguished Gallantry Medal
- Next (lower): Ad Astra Decoration

The Nkwe ya Boronse - Bronze Leopard, post-nominal letters NB, is a military decoration for bravery which was instituted in 2003. It is South Africa's third highest military decoration for bravery.

== Institution ==
The Nkwe ya Boronse - Bronze Leopard, post-nominal letters NB, was instituted by the President of the Republic of South Africa on 16 April 2003 and came into effect on 27 April 2003. The bilingual title of the decoration is in Sepedi and English. It is the junior of a set of three military decorations for bravery, along with the Nkwe ya Gauta - Golden Leopard and the Nkwe ya Selefera - Silver Leopard.

== Award criteria ==
The Nkwe ya Boronse can be awarded to all ranks of the South African National Defence Force and of any Auxiliary Service of the SANDF, and of any Armed Forces attached to or serving with or rendering any service to the SANDF, who have distinguished themselves by performing acts of bravery on a single occasion or over a period of time during military operations, or for exceptional combat leadership.

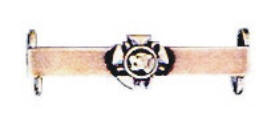
Bar to the Nkwe ya Boronse - Bronze Leopard

A Bar may be awarded for every subsequent action which would make recipients eligible for the award of the same decoration. The decoration and Bar may be awarded posthumously.

Guidelines, consisting of appropriate phrases which may be useful when writing a citation for the award of the Nkwe ya Boronse - Bronze Leopard, have been published by the South African Defence Department. The exceptional combat leadership criteria were apparently added after the Battle of Bangui in the Central African Republic from 22 to 24 March 2013.

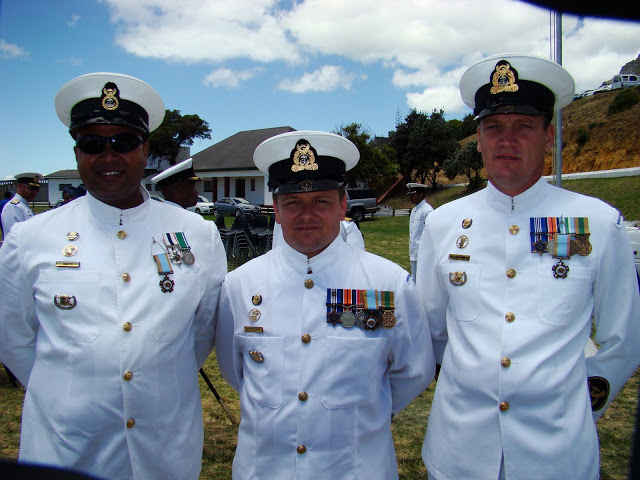
First recipients: CPO N.C. Smith NB CN, WO2 I. du Plessis NB PB and WO2 J. van Nieuwholtz NB PB

For acts of bravery

- Distinguished conduct.
- Distinguished above others.
- Incident or different incidents.
- Sustained high performance.
- More than normal.
- Positive conduct sheet.
- Creative.
- Initiative.

For exceptional combat leadership

- Incidents or deeds depicting outstanding leadership qualities.
- Result of operation in favour of the SANDF.
- Create trust amongst fellow soldiers.
- Places a high premium on the prevention of the loss of lives.
- Careful execution of the operational plan.

== Order of wear ==
The position of the Nkwe ya Boronse - Bronze Leopard in the official military and national orders of precedence is as follows:

Official military order of precedence

- Preceded by the Distinguished Gallantry Medal of the Republic of Bophuthatswana.
- Succeeded by the Ad Astra Decoration (AAD) of the Republic of South Africa.

Official national order of precedence

- Preceded by the Medal for Valour in the Prisons Service of the Republic of Bophuthatswana.
- Succeeded by the Mendi Decoration for Bravery, Bronze (MDB) of the Republic of South Africa.

== Description ==
Obverse

The Nkwe ya Boronse - Bronze Leopard is a five-armed cross pattée, struck in bronze, with a diameter of 38 millimetres. The extremities of the arms of the cross are embowed, with their flat surfaces urdy and their corners concave, with each pair of arms of the cross separated by three short rays. In the centre of the obverse is a light blue enamel roundel, 19 millimetres in diameter, with a bronze leopard's head.

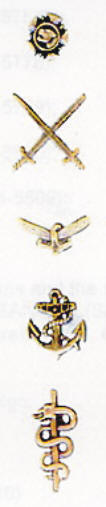
Bar button and insignia for the Army, Air Force, Navy and Military Health Service

Reverse

The reverse bears, in relief, the coat of arms of South Africa. The decoration is attached to a plain bronze suspender, fixed to the upper arm of the decoration. The medal number is stamped or engraved below the coat of arms.

Ribbon

The ribbon is 32 millimetres wide and sky blue, with 6 millimetres wide light brown edges. The blue represents the feathers of the blue crane, which Xhosa kings used to present to brave warriors.

Bar

The Bar for subsequent conferments of the Nkwe ya Boronse - Bronze Leopard is 33 millimetres in length and 5 millimetres high, struck in bronze and embossed in the centre with a replica of the decoration. When only a ribbon bar is worn, a button replica of the decoration, 8 millimetres in diameter and struck in bronze, is affixed to the ribbon bar.

Insignia

Award of the decoration for service in active military operations, is indicated by distinguishing insignia which indicate the arm of the service in which the recipient was serving at the time of the action for which the decoration was conferred. The insignia are struck in bronze and worn on the ribbon, above any bars which may have been awarded.

- Crossed swords for the South African Army.
- An eagle for the South African Air Force.
- An Anchor for the South African Navy.
- The Rod of Aesculapius for the South African Military Health Service.

== Recipients ==
In respect of those recipients about whom it is available, the actions they were cited for follow below the table, since inclusion in the table itself is impractical.

Name	Rank	NS no.	Date of action	Unit	Service Arm	Photo
van Nieuwholtz, J. PB (Note: Operation Bapisa – The clearing of unexploded ordnance from 26 March to 27 April 2007.)	WO2	001	27 Nov 2008	Diving Sch	SA Navy	
Du Plessis, Ivor PB	CPO	002	27 Nov 2008	Diving Sch	SA Navy	
Smith, N.C. CN	CPO	003	27 Nov 2008	Diving Sch	SA Navy	
Silva, Michel (Note: Battle of Bangui – Awarded for actions during the Battle of Bangui in the Central African Republic from 22 to 24 March 2013.)	Maj	007	22 Mar 2013	Inf Fmn	SA Army	
Jiyana, Stephen	Maj	012	22 Mar 2013	1 Para Bn	SA Army	
Rabilwana, Mphetshanga Wilson CM MMM	WO2	006	22 Mar 2013	5 SFR	SA Army	
Nkosi, Big-Boy Alphios	S Sgt	011	22 Mar 2013	5 SFR	SA Army	
Mampa, Serole Colman	Sgt	022	22 Mar 2013	7 Med Bn Gp	SAMHS	
Ngobese, Mandla Maxwell	Cpl	009	22 Mar 2013	7 Med Bn Gp	SAMHS	
Nkoana, Molatelo Alphina	Cpl	015	22 Mar 2013	7 Med Bn Gp	SAMHS	
Smith, Shane Jacque Donavon	L Cpl	008	22 Mar 2013	44 Para Reg	SA Army	
Bojane, Motsamai William †	Rfn	013	22 Mar 2013	1 Para Bn	SA Army	
Mxhosana, Zamani Jim †	Rfn	014	22 Mar 2013	1 Para Bn	SA Army	
Moloke, Khotso Lucas †	Rfn	024	22 Mar 2013	1 Para Bn	SA Army	

Note 1: † denotes a posthumous award.
