= Ad Astra Decoration =

South African Air Force award

- Type: Military decoration for bravery
- Awarded for: Excellent airmanship or outstanding ingenuity or skill during emergencies or critically unusual situations in the air
- Country: South Africa
- Presented by: the State President and, from 1994, the President
- Eligibility: South African Air Force aircrew
- Post-nominals: AAD
- Status: Discontinued in 2003
- Established: 1991
- First award: 1995
- Ribbon bar

SADF pre-1994 & SANDF post-2002 orders of wear
- Next (higher): SADF precedence: Pro Virtute Medal; SANDF precedence: Nkwe ya Boronse
- Next (lower): SADF succession: Army Cross; SANDF succession: Army Cross

The Ad Astra Decoration, post-nominal letters AAD, was instituted by the Republic of South Africa in 1991, to reward South African Air Force aircrew members on board aircraft for excellent airmanship or outstanding ingenuity or skill during emergencies or critically unusual situations in the air. It was discontinued in 2003, but backdated awards can still be made for acts performed during the period in effect.

== The South African military ==
The Union Defence Forces (UDF) were established in 1912 and renamed the South African Defence Force (SADF) in 1958. On 27 April 1994 it was integrated with six other independent forces into the South African National Defence Force (SANDF).

== Motivation ==
In 1952, when South Africa instituted its own military decorations and medals to replace the British honours which could, until then, be awarded to members of the UDF, equivalents of, amongst others, the British Distinguished Flying Cross (DFC) and Air Force Cross (AFC) were omitted. This omission was only belatedly addressed near the end of the 1966-1989 Border War, in 1987, when the institution of the South African Air Force Cross was proposed.

As proposed, the Air Force Cross (CA) was intended for award only to aircrew who displayed exceptional courage and leadership during dangerous or critical situations while airborne, where an award for bravery would not be suitable, based on the premise that bravery involves knowingly entering mortal danger from a position of relative safety, as opposed to skillfully reacting to an unforeseen situation of mortal danger. The proposed criteria were described in the draft warrant as excellent airmanship or outstanding ingenuity or skill during emergencies or unusual situations in the air.

When the other three Arms of the Service subsequently proposed that an Army Cross (CM), a Navy Cross (CN) and a Medical Service Cross (CC) should be instituted simultaneously, the proposed award criteria of all four crosses were amended to outstanding ingenuity or skill in the utilisation and control of personnel, weaponry or other equipment in dangerous situations and, in the case of the proposed Air Force Cross, not necessarily restricted to flying.

== The Ad Astra Decoration ==
Since the requirement for a decoration similar to the British Distinguished Flying Cross still existed, the institution of the Ad Astra Decoration, post-nominal letters AAD, was proposed in 1991. As was originally intended with the Air Force Cross, the criteria were again described in the draft warrant as excellent airmanship or outstanding ingenuity or skill during emergencies or critically unusual situations in the air. Two of the examples which served as motivation, would without doubt have qualified the respective pilots for the award of the equivalent of a Distinguished Flying Cross, had such a decoration existed in South Africa at the time.

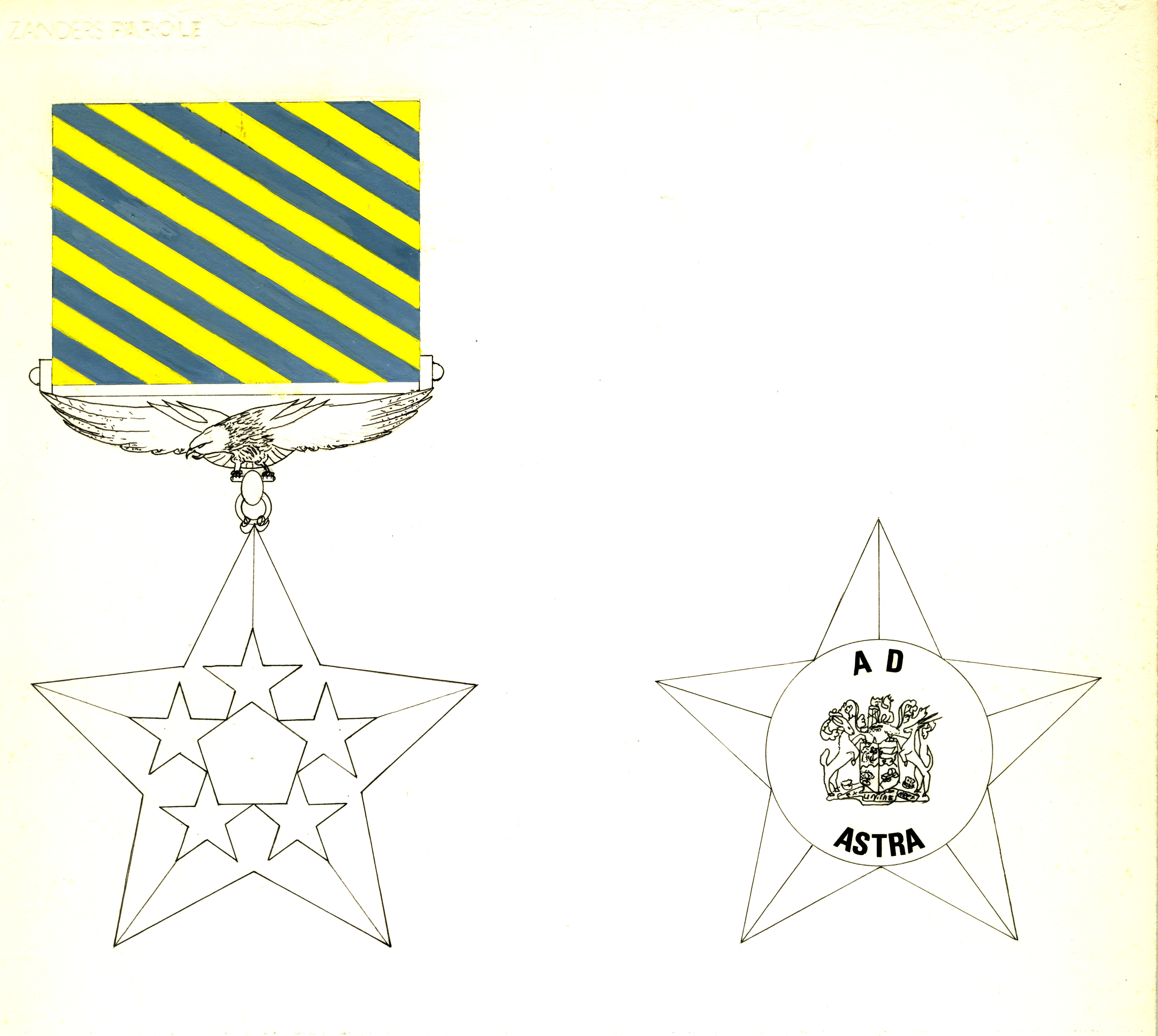
First proposed design

- One such incident was an in-flight malfunction in a Canberra B(1) Mk. 12, which disabled the aircraft's control column. In spite of advice from the ground to ditch the aircraft, since the pilot would be unlikely to be able to land it safely, he managed to land it at Air Force Base Waterkloof with minimal damage, while having only trim, rudder and engine power adjustments as controls.
- Another example was a Dakota C-47, which lost its rudder and elevators when struck by a surface-to-air missile, whose commander managed to land safely at Air Force Base Grootfontein by having his passengers, most of them serving General- and Flag Officers, move forward and backward in the cabin as required, to alter the aircraft's centre of gravity.

== Institution ==
The Ad Astra Decoration was instituted by the State President in 1991.

== Award criteria ==
The decoration could be awarded for excellent airmanship or outstanding ingenuity or skill during emergencies or unusual situations on board aircraft in flight. A bar, instituted in 1993, could be awarded in recognition of further similar displays of excellent airmanship. The decoration was first awarded in 1995, to Major L.R. Heemstra.

== Order of wear ==
The position of the Ad Astra Decoration in the official order of precedence was revised twice to accommodate the inclusion or institution of new decorations and medals, first with the integration into the South African National Defence Force in 1994 and again with the institution of a new set of awards in 2003.

South African Defence Force until 26 April 1994

- Official SADF order of precedence:
  - Preceded by the Pro Virtute Medal (PVM).
  - Succeeded by the Army Cross (CM).
- Official national order of precedence:
  - Preceded by the Pro Virtute Medal (PVM).
  - Succeeded by the Army Cross (CM).

South African National Defence Force from 27 April 1994

- Official SANDF order of precedence:
  - Preceded by the Distinguished Gallantry Medal of the Republic of Bophuthatswana.
  - Succeeded by the Army Cross (CM) of the Republic of South Africa.
- Official national order of precedence:
  - Preceded by the Medal for Valour in the Prisons Service of the Republic of Bophuthatswana.
  - Succeeded by the Army Cross (CM) of the Republic of South Africa.

South African National Defence Force from 27 April 2003

- Official SANDF order of precedence:
  - Preceded by the Nkwe ya Boronse (NB) of the Republic of South Africa.
  - Succeeded by the Army Cross (CM) of the Republic of South Africa.
- Official national order of precedence:
  - Preceded by the Mendi Decoration for Bravery, Bronze (MDB) of the Republic of South Africa.
  - Succeeded by the Army Cross (CM) of the Republic of South Africa.

== Description ==
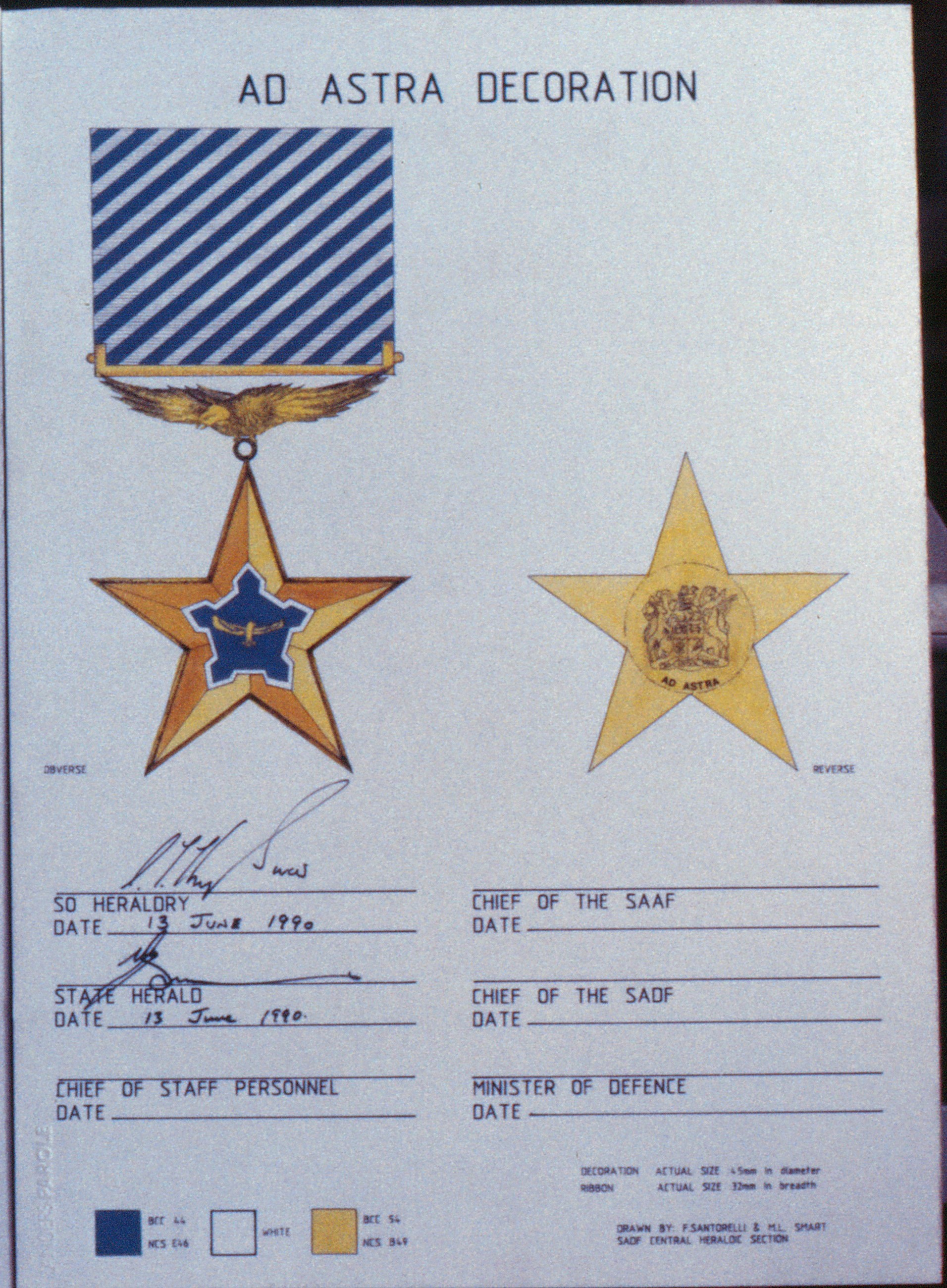
Heraldic drawing prior to approval

Obverse

The Ad Astra Decoration is a five-pointed star in silver-gilt, to fit in a circle 45 millimetres in diameter, with the South African Air Force castle roundel raised in the centre, all struck in one piece, 5 millimetres thick at the centre of the castle, with the star points tapering down to 2 millimetres at the edges. The suspender is an eagle in flight.

Reverse

The reverse has the pre-1994 South African Coat of Arms, with the words "AD ASTRA" underneath, with an impressed or engraved decoration number.

Ribbon

The ribbon is 32 millimetres wide, with diagonal 4 millimetres wide light blue and white lines, slanted upwards from left to right toward the left shoulder of the recipient. The direction of the slant of the lines was purposely the opposite of that of the British DFC and AFC, at the specific request of the Chief of the Air Force, Lieutenant General Jan van Loggerenberg.

Ad Astra Decoration and Bar

Bar

The bar is silver-gilt and has a Protea emblem embossed in the centre. The same bar was used to indicate multiple awards of the Pro Virtute Decoration, Southern Cross Decoration, Pro Merito Decoration and Ad Astra Decoration.

== Discontinuation ==
Conferment of the decoration was discontinued in respect of services performed on or after 27 April 2003. No suitable new honour was instituted to replace it.
