= Military Merit Medal (South Africa) =

Military award for service of high order

- Type: Military decoration for merit
- Awarded for: Service of a high order
- Country: South Africa
- Presented by: the Chief of the South African Defence Force, from 1993 the State President, and from 1994 the President
- Eligibility: All Ranks
- Post-nominals: MMM
- Status: Discontinued in 2003
- Established: 1974
- First award: 1974
- Final award: 27 April 2003
- Ribbon bar

SADF pre-1994 & SANDF post-2002 orders of wear
- Next (higher): SADF precedence: Jack Hindon Medal; SANDF precedence: Jack Hindon Medal
- Next (lower): SADF succession: Korea Medal; SANDF succession: Defence Force Commendation Medal

The Military Merit Medal, post-nominal letters MMM, is a military decoration which was instituted in the Republic of South Africa on 9 October 1974 as the Chief of the Defence Force's Commendation Medal. It could be awarded to all ranks of the South African Defence Force for service of a high order.

== The South African military ==
The Union Defence Forces (UDF) were established in 1912 and renamed the South African Defence Force (SADF) in 1958. On 27 April 1994, it was integrated with six other independent forces into the South African National Defence Force (SANDF).

== Institution ==
The Military Merit Medal, post-nominal letters MMM, was instituted by the Chief of the Defence Force as the Defence Force's Commendation Medal on 9 October 1974. In 1993 it was ratified and formally instituted by the State President as the Military Merit Medal.

== Development ==
=== Commendation ===
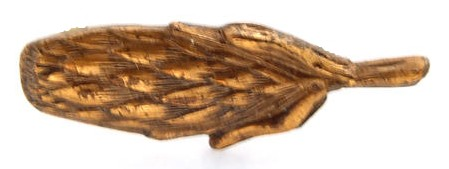

In 1968, the Commandant General of the South African Defence Force instituted the Commendation by the Commandant General, which was awarded for service of a high order which did not qualify for a decoration. Recipients were entitled to wear a bronze protea flower emblem on a strip of tunic cloth, mounted like a medal ribbon and placed in the last position on their ribbon bars.

About 500 awards were made and, from the appearance of the emblem, it became irreverently known as the "Mielieblaar" (Corn leaf). When the title of Commandant General was changed to Chief of the Defence Force, after Admiral Hugo Biermann was appointment in that post in 1972, the name of the award was changed accordingly to the Chief of the Defence Force's Commendation.

=== Medal ===
On 9 October 1974, the Chief of the Defence Force's Commendation was replaced by the Chief of the Defence Force's Commendation Medal, which was still awarded by the Chief of the Defence Force for service of a high order. All the members of the "Mielieblaar Club" received the new medal, to replace the protea flower emblem. Even though it was officially sanctioned, the medal was considered unofficial and assumed the lowest position in the order of precedence, since it was not instituted or awarded by the State President.

=== Decoration ===
In 1992, a committee, chaired by Brigadier (Professor) Deon Fourie and with Colonel André Kritzinger, Commandants Ray Burgess and Piet Joubert, Major (State Herald) Fred Brownell and representatives of all four Arms of the Service as members, was tasked with the revision of the South African military orders, decorations and medals. Of the resulting recommendations, one of those which was approved in 1993 was that, since the State President was the Fount of Honour and the award of a military medal by the Chief of the Defence Force was therefore inappropriate, the Chief of the Defence Force's Commendation Medal should be upgraded to a full-fledged military decoration, awarded by the State President. The name Military Merit Medal was proposed, as well as that its position in the official order of wear should be revised accordingly.

Another recommendation, which was approved in 1993, was that all awards for bravery and meritorious service should be considered as decorations and that recipients of all these awards should be granted the privilege of using appropriate post-nominal letters. The post-nominal letters which were proposed along with this recommendation, were for the following decorations:

- Four existing honours, the Southern Cross Medal (1975) (SM), Pro Merito Medal (1975) (PMM), Danie Theron Medal (DTM) and Military Merit Medal (MMM).
- One discontinued honour, eighteen years after it had been discontinued, the Jack Hindon Medal (JHM).
- Seven new decorations which had recently been instituted, the Pro Virtute Decoration (PVD), Pro Virtute Medal (PVM), Ad Astra Decoration (AAD), Army Cross (CM), Air Force Cross (CA), Navy Cross (CN) and Medical Service Cross (CC).

== Award criteria ==
The Military Merit Medal could be awarded to all ranks of the South African Defence Force, for service of a high order. The use of post-nominal letters by all recipients since 1968, was allowed from 1993. A bar, instituted in 1993 as well, could be awarded in recognition of further similar displays of service of a high order.

== Order of wear ==
The position of the Military Merit Medal in the official order of precedence was revised four times after 1975, to accommodate the inclusion or institution of new decorations and medals, first when its status was raised from an award by the Chief of the Defence Force to a decoration by the State President, again upon the integration into the South African National Defence Force on 27 April 1994, then again in April 1996, when decorations and medals were belatedly instituted for the two former non-statutory forces, the Azanian People's Liberation Army and Umkhonto we Sizwe, and finally upon the institution of a new set of awards on 27 April 2003. Its position remained unchanged, as it was on 27 April 1994, upon the latter two occasions.

South African Defence Force until 26 April 1994

- Official SADF order of precedence:
  - Preceded by the Jack Hindon Medal (JHM).
  - Succeeded by the Korea Medal.
- Official national order of precedence:
  - Preceded by the Jack Hindon Medal (JHM).
  - Succeeded by the Civil Defence Medal for Meritorious Service.

South African National Defence Force from 27 April 1994

- Official SANDF order of precedence:
  - Preceded by the Jack Hindon Medal (JHM) of the Republic of South Africa.
  - Succeeded by the Defence Force Commendation Medal of the Republic of Bophuthatswana.
- Official national order of precedence:
  - Preceded by the Jack Hindon Medal (JHM) of the Republic of South Africa.
  - Succeeded by the Civil Defence Medal for Meritorious Service of the Republic of South Africa.

== Description ==
Obverse

The Military Merit Medal was struck in bronze, with an engrailed edge which has twelve points, to fit in a circle 38 millimetres in diameter, and is 3 millimetres thick at the centre. It depicts the South African Defence Force emblem in a circle, framed by twelve protea flowers.

Reverse

The reverse is smooth and displays the pre-1994 South African Coat of Arms, with the decoration number impressed underneath.

Military Merit Medal and Bar

Bar

The bar was struck in bronze and has a protea emblem embossed in the centre.

Ribbon

The ribbon is 32 millimetres wide, with dark blue and light blue bands, both 5 millimetres wide, a dark orange band in the centre, 12 millimetres wide, and light blue and dark blue bands, both 5 millimetres wide. The colours represent the three Arms of the Service, prior to the formation of the South African Medical Service as a separate fourth Arm, dark orange for the Army, light blue for the Air Force and dark blue for the Navy.

Versions

The original medal and ribbon suspender were struck separately and attached to each other with a small ring, which enabled the medal to swing. Later versions were struck in one piece, with the suspender as an integral part of the medal, as depicted.

== Discontinuation ==
Conferment of the decoration was discontinued in respect of services performed on or after 27 April 2003, when the Military Merit Medal was replaced by the iPhrothiya yeBhronzi (PB).
