= Cape Town Highlanders =

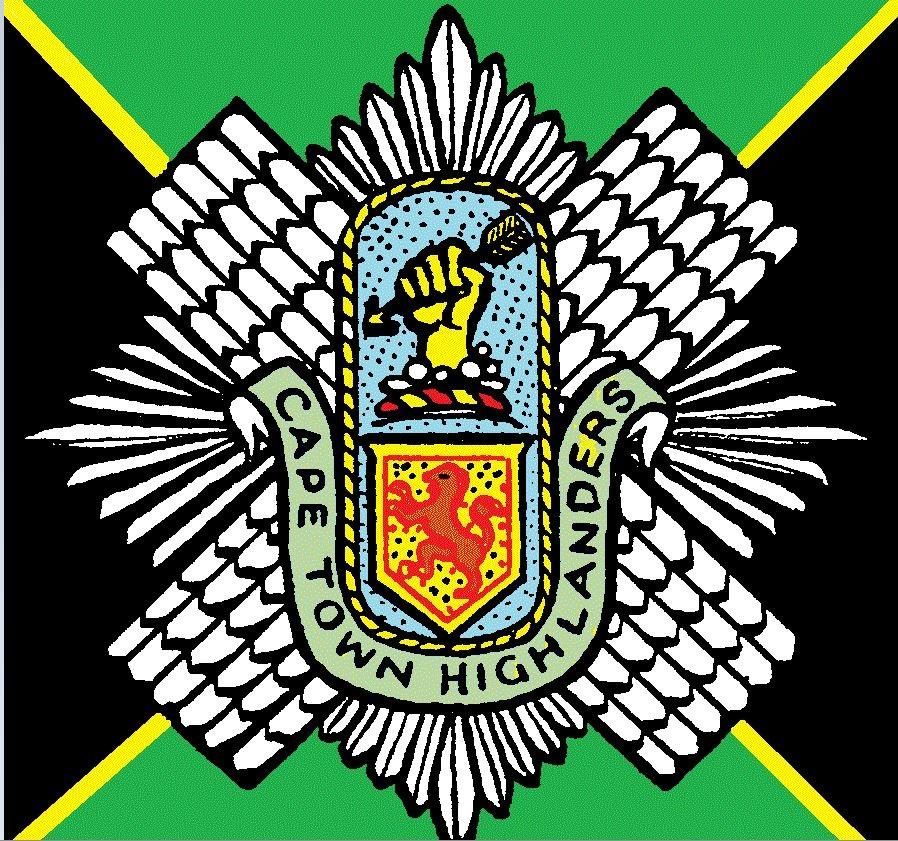
- Regimental emblem
- Founded: 24 April 1885; 141 years ago
- Country: South Africa
- Branch: South African Army
- Type: Infantry
- Role: Mechanised infantry
- Size: One battalion
- Part of: South African Infantry Formation; Army Conventional Reserve
- Garrison/HQ: Castle Barracks, Cape Town, South Africa
- Mottos: Nemo Me Impune Lacessit (Latin for "no one provokes me with impunity"); Bydand (Scots for "abiding, steadfast")
- March: Quick: Cock o' the North
- Anniversaries: 24 April (Regimental Day)

Commanders
- Colonel of the Regiment: Colonel P. McLoughlin PVD, SM, MMM

Insignia
- Abbreviation: CTH
- Tartan: Gordon
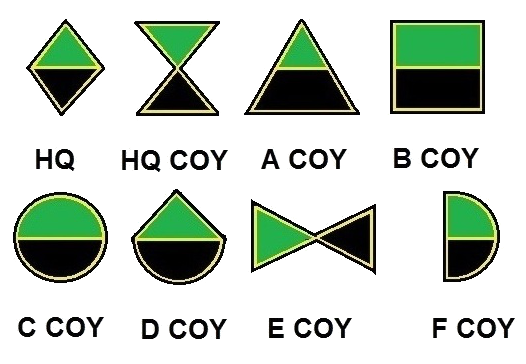
- Company level Insignia

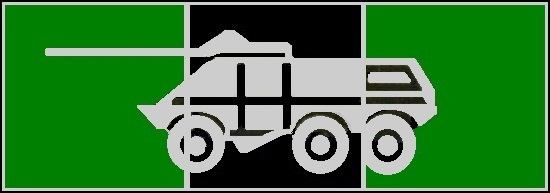
- SA Mechanised Infantry beret bar circa 1992

The Cape Town Highlanders is a reserve mechanised infantry regiment of the South African Army.

== History ==
=== Origins ===
Descendants of Scottish immigrants to South Africa raised the Cape Town Highlanders in 1885. On 24 April of the same year, their services were accepted – since then, this date has always been celebrated as the regiment's official birthday.

=== Bechuanaland Campaign ===
The regiment first saw active duty during the Bechuanaland Campaign that was fought in the Northern Cape between 1896 and 1897.

=== Anglo-Boer War ===
At the outbreak of the Second Anglo-Boer War the regiment was again mobilised for active duty. During the war the regiment or elements thereof took part in several actions, including the relief of Kimberley.

=== Volunteer era ===
The Duke of Connaught and Strathearn became colonel-in-chief of the regiment in 1906, and the regiment's name was thus changed to the Duke of Connaught and Strathearn's Own Cape Town Highlanders.

=== With the Union Defence Force ===
When the regiment was embodied in the Union Defence Force (UDF) Citizen Force in 1913, the title was changed to 6th Infantry (Duke of Connaught and Strathearn's Own Cape Town Highlanders).

==== World War I ====
During World War I the Cape Town Highlanders first fought against Germany in German South-West Africa, but was subsequently combined with the Transvaal Scottish Regiment to form the 4th South African Infantry (South African Scottish) Regiment, part of the 1st South African Brigade. (The South African Scottish, like various similar units, was formed by the South African government since a clause in the Defence Act of that time prohibited existing units from serving so far outside the country's borders.) After fighting in the Senussi Campaign in North Africa the brigade was shipped to France, where it took part in many battles between 1916 and 1918, including the famous Battle of Delville Wood. During its time on the Western Front, the South African Brigade and its Scottish heritage 4th Battalion, first served a lengthy stint with the British 9th (Scottish) Division, and following the Brigade's decimation in March 1918, was reconstituted and incorporated in September into the 66th (2nd East Lancashire) Division until the end of the war.

The title was changed again, in 1932, to Cape Town Highlanders (Duke of Connaught and Strathearn's Own).

==== World War II ====
At the outbreak of World War II in 1939 the regiment was again mobilised. However, it did not fight in the first campaign of the South African Army in the war, the Abyssinian campaign of 1940 to 1941. However, in mid-1941, the regiment was briefly sent to Egypt to escort thousands of Italian prisoners of war to internment camps in South Africa; it returned to Egypt in late June of the same year to join the newly arrived South African 1st Infantry Division in the Western Desert.

The Cape Town Highlanders fought in all of the major battles of the Western Desert campaign, including the Battle of El Alamein. Indeed, the regiment is one of only three in the world (all of them South African) to have not only the usual two Alamein battle honours – "Alamein Defence" and "El Alamein" – but a third, "Alamein Box", which resulted from a separate action during the initial defence. This action played a significant role in halting Rommel's advance on the tired and depleted British Eighth Army.

During the regiment's subsequent deployment to Italy, the regiment was temporarily combined with South Africa's senior Scottish unit, the First City Regiment, to form the First City/Cape Town Highlanders. This combined unit fought from Battle of Monte Cassino to the Alps, culminating in the heroic capture at bayonet-point of the strategic peak of Monte Sole as part of the South African 6th Armoured Division.

In 1947, Queen Elizabeth (later Queen Elizabeth the Queen Mother) was appointed colonel-in-chief, and from 1948 until South Africa became a republic in 1961, the regiment was the Queen's Own Cape Town Highlanders.

=== With the SADF ===
Until 1967 the Regiment served as a de facto guard of honour battalion as well as in imitation of the Foot Guards of the British Army and the current Balaklava Company, Argyll and Sutherland Highlanders, 5th Battalion, Royal Regiment of Scotland.

==== Border War ====
The first significant post-war action of the Cape Town Highlanders took place in January 1976, during Operation Savannah. This was the first large-scale incursion by the South African Defence Force (SADF) into Angola during the 23-year-long "Border War" in South-West Africa (now Namibia). During the following years the regiment was mobilised several times, including for Operation Prone and others. The last mobilisation during this period occurred in October 1988.

=== With the SANDF ===
The regiment was mobilised in April 1994 as part of the efforts by the South African National Defence Force to ensure a peaceful first fully democratic election.

As a result of the subsequent abolition of conscription and the transformation of the South African Army, the Cape Town Highlanders Regiment returned to its original form of a volunteer regiment.

In 2000 a contingent of the Cape Town Highlanders attended the Queen Mother's 100th birthday and paraded the regiment's Colour on Horse Guards Parade. The Drums and Pipes participated in a special parade centenary for the Queen Mother in Edinburgh, and carried on to participate in the Edinburgh Military Tattoo. With the death of the Queen Mother in 2002, the regiment sent a contingent to participate in her funeral procession. The Drums and Pipes have since performed regularly at the Edinburgh Military Tattoo (2002, 2004, 2006, 2009 and 2012). In 2006, they were invited, together with the Queensland Police Pipe Band and 4 bands from the new Royal Regiment of Scotland to perform at Balmoral Castle for the Royal Family. The Band has also participated in the Basel Tattoo, The Berlin Military Tattoo, Jinhae (South Korea) and at the Cape Town Tattoo, held in the Castle of Good Hope.

The weekend of 24 April 2015 saw the 130-year anniversary of the Cape Town Highlanders' creation, marked by regimental celebration dinners, the exercising of the unit's right to the Freedom of the City in Cape Town, as well as a medal and church parade.

==== Name change ====
In August 2019, it was announced that 52 South African Army Reserve units would have their names changed to reflect the diverse military history of South Africa. The Cape Town Highlanders was due to be known as the Gonnema Regiment, and along with units undergoing name changes had 3 years from the announcement in August 2019 to design and implement new regimental insignia. In an announcement by the SANDF's Directorate Defence Corporate Communication in June 2022 regarding name changes of South African Army Reserve units in Cape Town, it was confirmed that the unit has not officially changed its name and remains known as the Cape Town Highlanders.

== Current capability ==
The regiment is currently a mechanised infantry regiment in the SANDF and has sent members as part of the peacekeeping contingent to the Democratic Republic of the Congo (DRC) and Burundi. It has also taken part in internal deployments in support of the police as well as protecting the border.

In the draft South African Army Vision 2020 force design, the 2007 organograms published with Leon Engelbrecht's unpublished manuscript A Guide to the SANDF chart the Cape Town Highlanders as a sealanding battalion in the Special Operations Brigade, paired with 9 SAI, and also as motorised infantry under 2 Motorised Brigade (Cape) of the Motorised Division. Later public sources, however, continued to describe the regiment as mechanised infantry: South African Army Western Cape contact tables (December 2010) listed it as Mech Infantry (Reserve), defenceWeb's fact file gives the current role as mechanised infantry, and the regiment has been counted among reserve mechanised units allocated the Ratel.

== Regimental symbols ==
- Regimental tartan: The Gordon regimental tartan from the clan Gordon as previously worn by The Gordon Highlanders; it is the only regiment in the world to wear the kilt in this tartan.
- Regimental mottos: The regiment has two mottos. The first, "Nemo Me Impune Lacessit", is in Latin and means "No Man Challenges me with Impunity"; it is used by several Scottish regiments. The second, "Bydand", is in Doric and means "Steadfast". This motto was unique to The Gordon Highlanders and the Cape Town Highlanders. However, with the amalgamation of The Gordon Highlanders with other Scottish units, this motto has fallen into disuse by them; the Cape Town Highlanders still uses it on a shield that also bears a stag's head which is worn on the ceremonial sporran by those with the rank of corporal and below.
- Regimental quick march: The regimental quick march is "Cock o' the North"; it was also the march of The Gordon Highlanders and commemorates the Marquess of Huntly, son of the Duke of Gordon, whose nickname was the "Cock o' The North".

=== Dress insignia ===
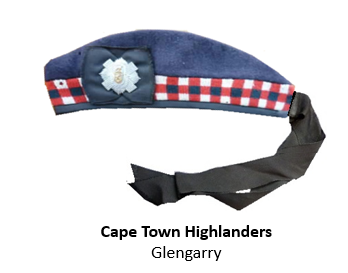
Cape Town Highlanders glengarry

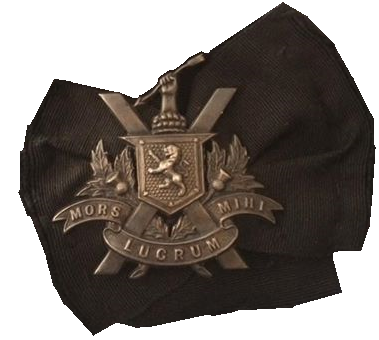
UDF era WW1 South African Scottish or 4th Infantry Regiment beret badge

During WW1 the Union Defence Force established the 4th Infantry Regiment which was unique in that it was the South African Scottish, raised from the Transvaal Scottish and the Cape Town Highlanders, and wearing the Atholl Murray tartan. This regiment's collar badges were identical to those of the Cape Town Highlanders but bore the Latin motto "Mors Lucrum Mihi" (Death is my reward) in place of the usual Cape Town Highlander wording. (Death is my Reward), was the family motto of the first Officer Commanding SA Scottish, a Lieutenant-Colonel F.A. Jones.

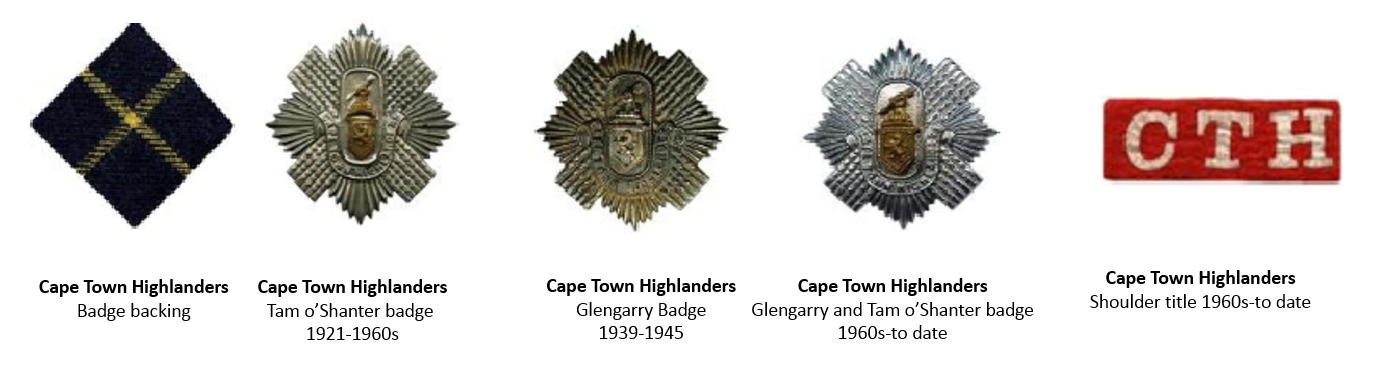
SANDF Cape Town Highlanders insignia

== Customs ==
The unit wears black instead of brown boots as a mark of mourning for a Scottish soldier, Major-General Sir John Moore, Commander of the Highland Brigade

Two types of headgear, the khaki Balmoral bonnet and the Glengarry, which is blue with red-and-white dicing. The Balmoral is worn during daytime as a general working headdress, regardless of the order of dress being worn or whether the wearer is in barracks or in the field, although in the latter case it is sometimes replaced by a bush-hat or helmet. The glengarry is worn for walking out; on ceremonial, mess and social occasions; and after Retreat has been sounded at 18h00.

Officers carry an ash wood walking stick, called a Cane's Ash, on all occasions except mess and other formal functions; or when armed with a claymore or rifle.

Non-commissioned officers are entitled to carry a "swagger stick" as a mark of their important status in the regiment.

No officer or NCO may eat before his men have eaten.

== Alliances ==
- United Kingdom – The Highlanders
- Australia – The Royal Victoria Regiment

== Battle honours ==
=== Awarded ===
Battle Honours
Awarded
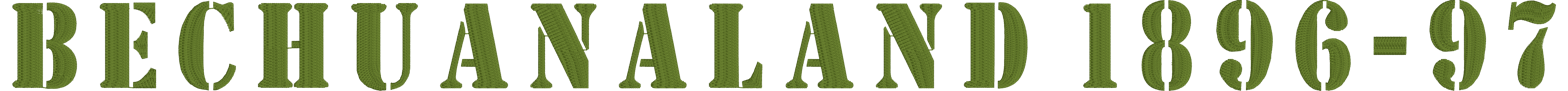
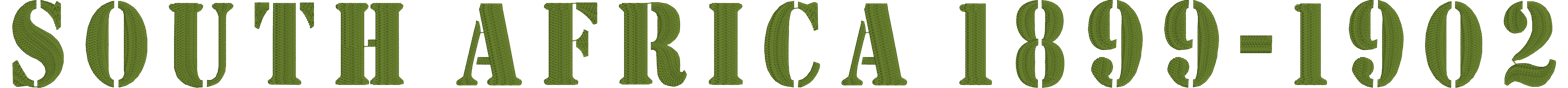
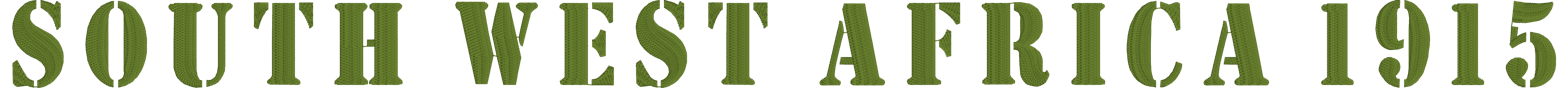
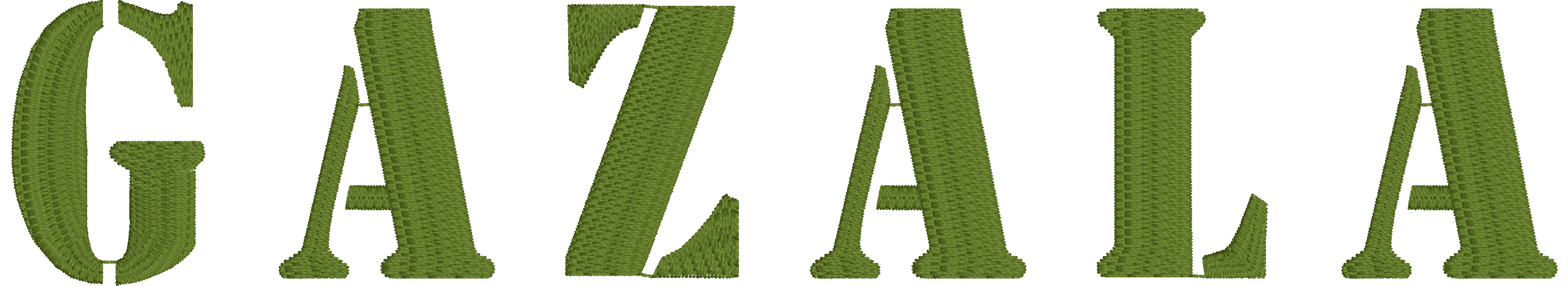
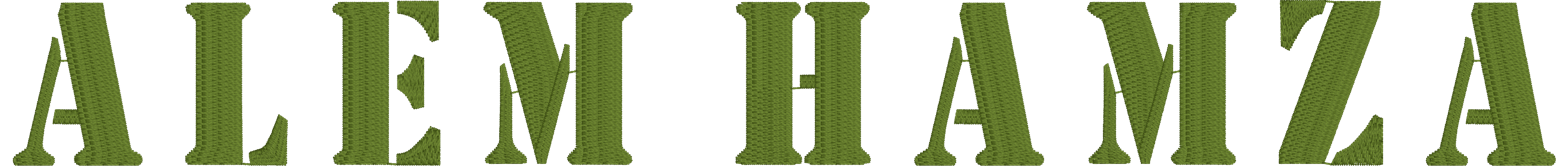
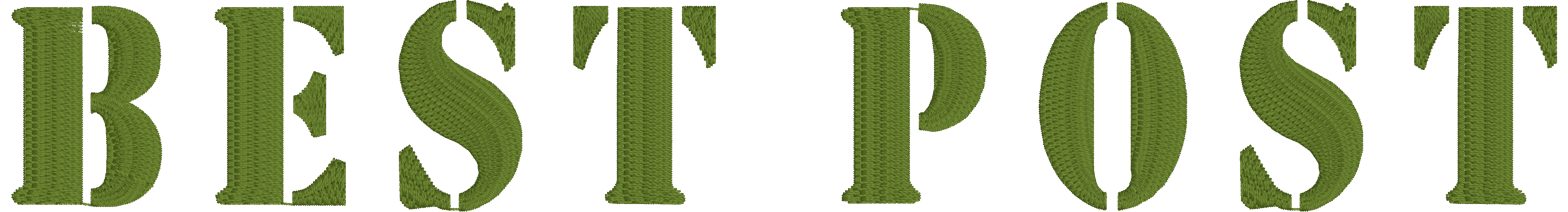
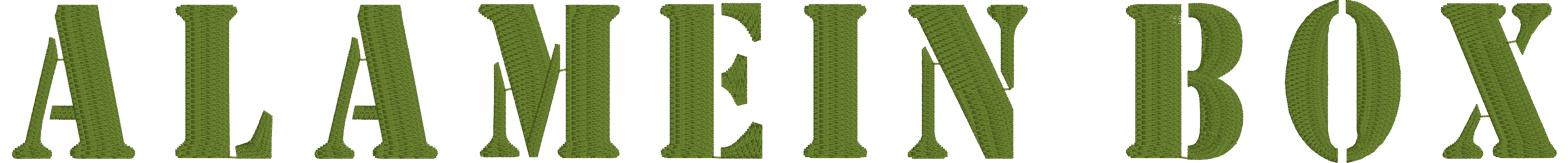
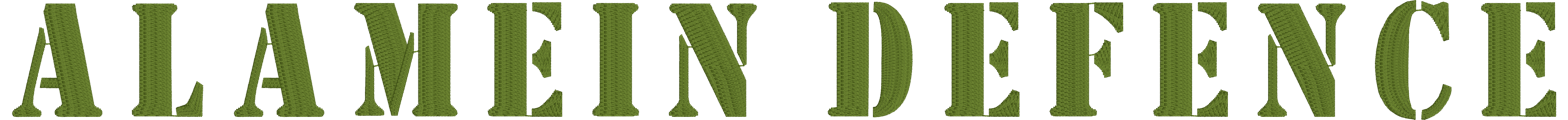
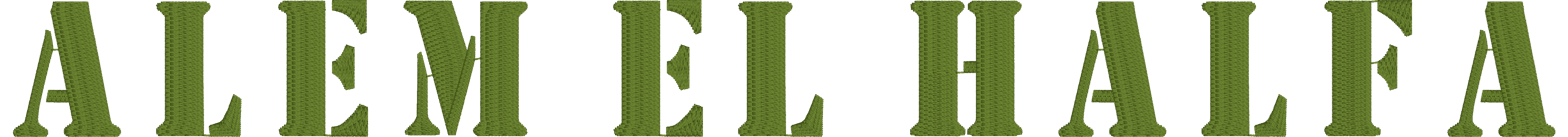
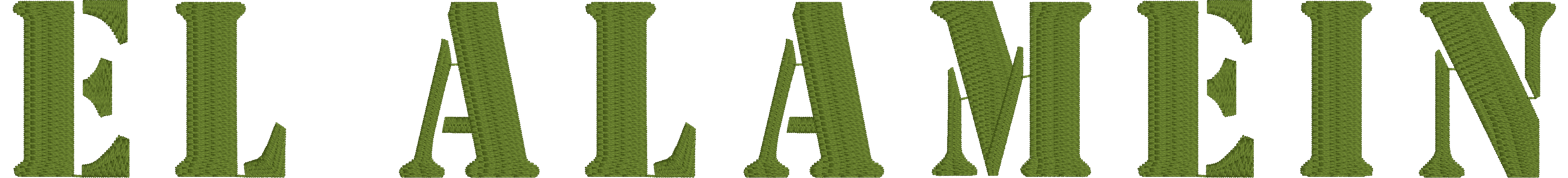
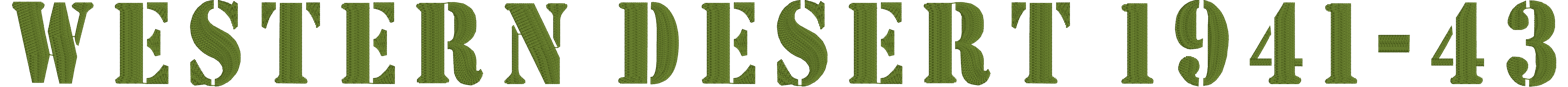
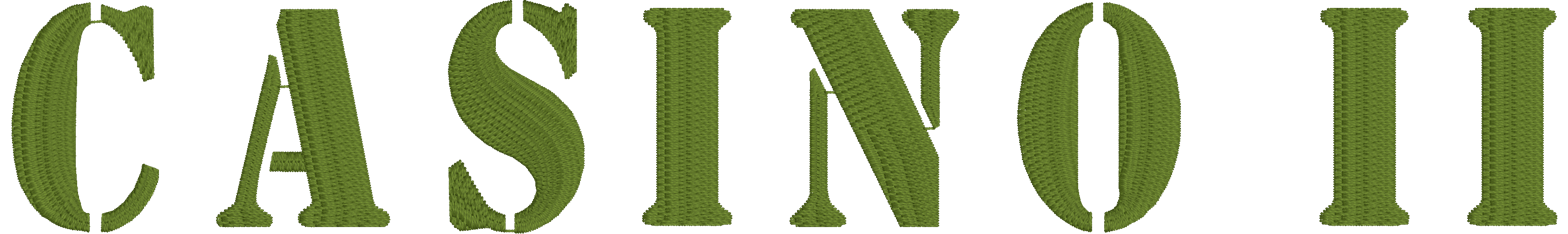
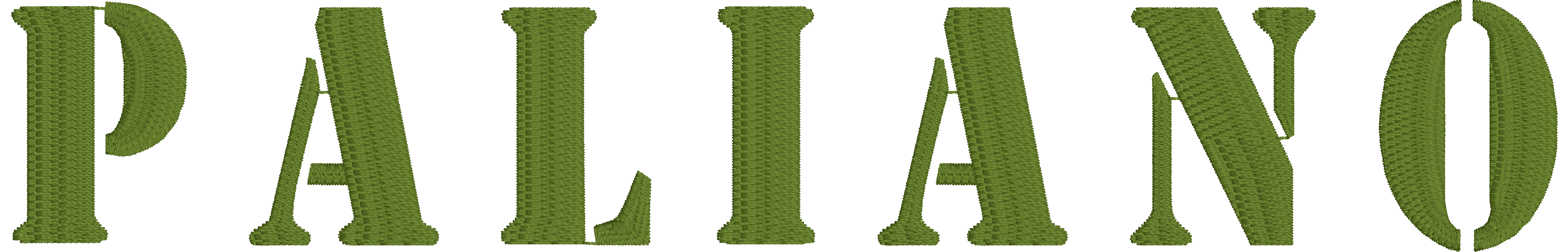
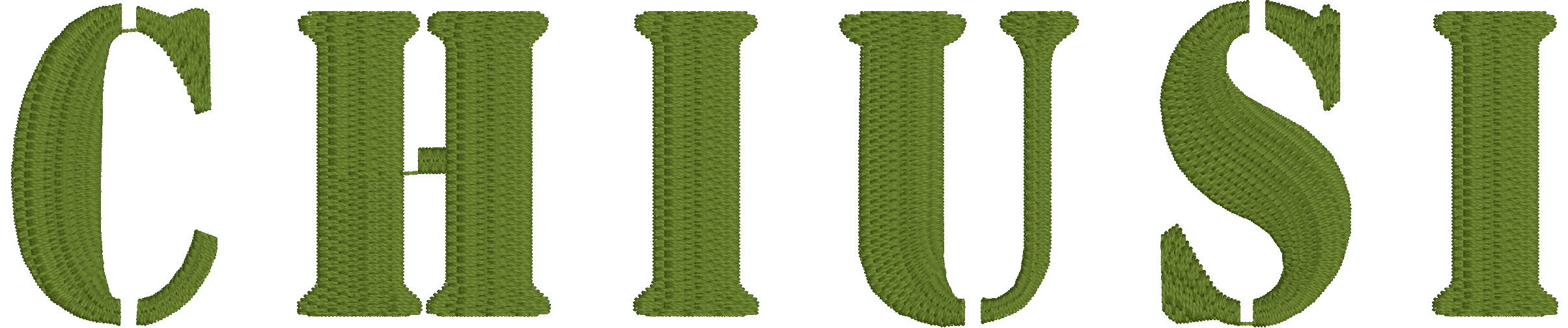
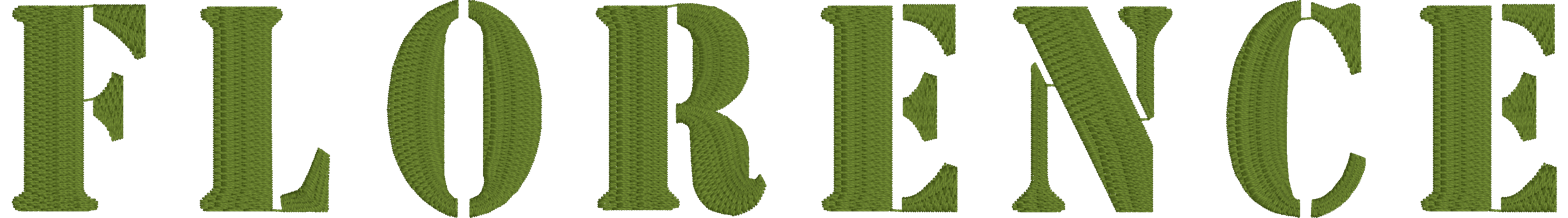
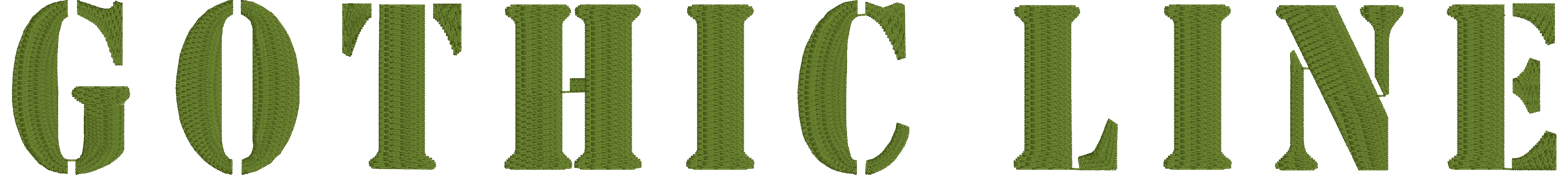
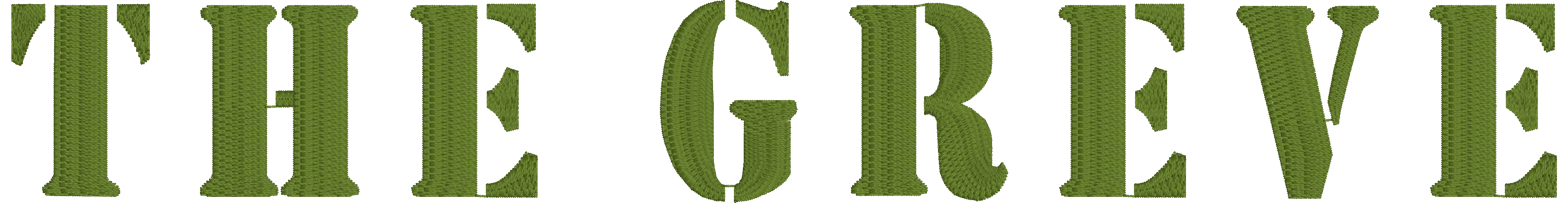
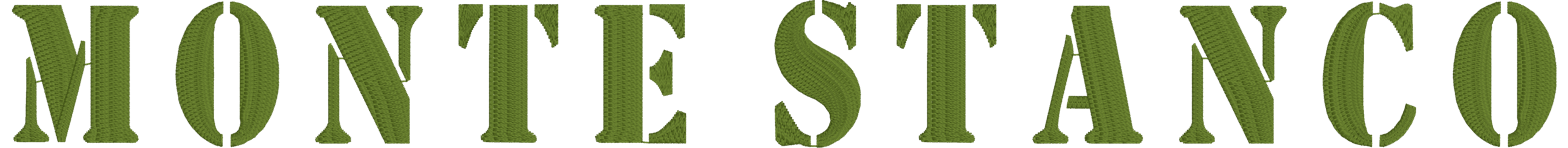
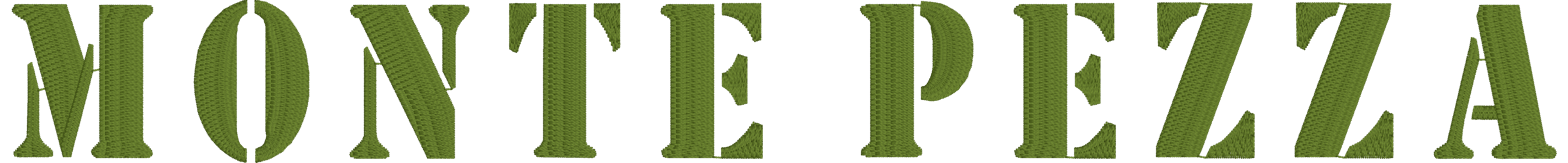
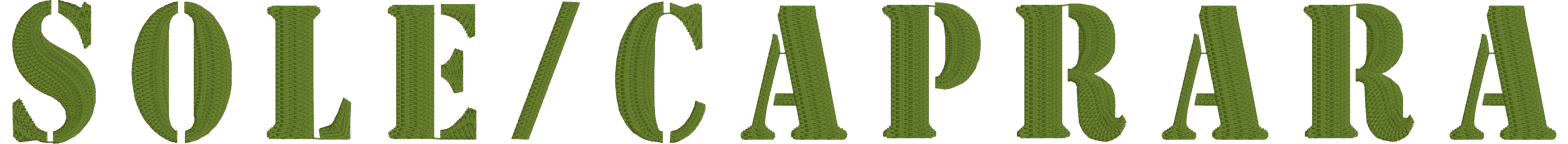
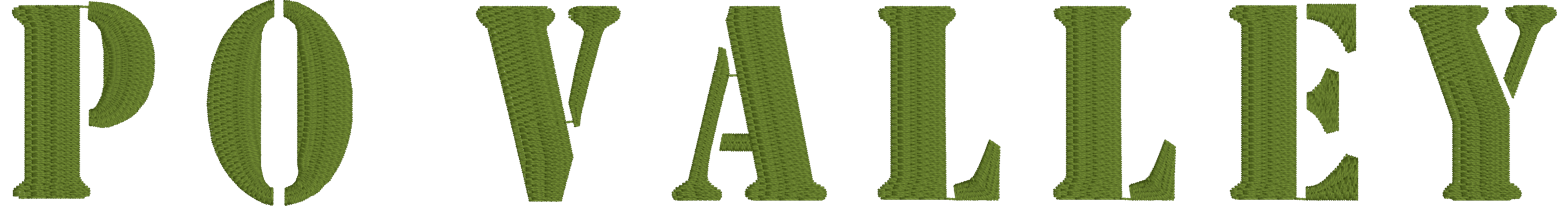
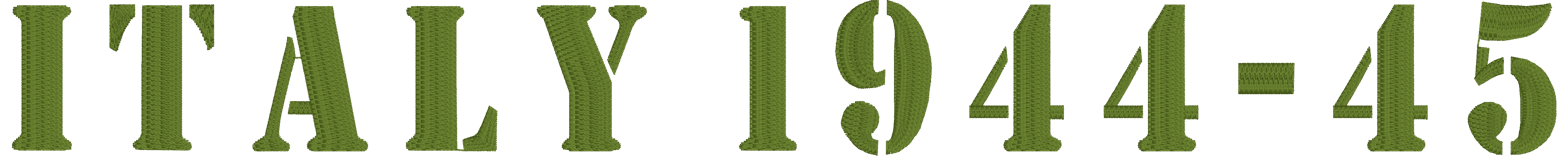

The Cape Town Highlanders Regiment has the following battle honours on its regimental colours: Bechuanaland 1896–97, *South Africa 1899–1902, South West Africa 1915, Gazala, Alem Hamza, Best Post, Alamein Box, Alamein Defence. Alem el Halfa, Battle of El Alamein, Western Desert 1941–43, Cassino II, Paliano, Chiusi, Florence, Gothic Line, The Greve, Monte Stanco, Monte Pezza, Sole/Caprara, Po Valley, Italy 1944–45

=== The "Lost" colours ===
The South African Union Defence Act of 1914 prohibited the deployment of South African troops beyond the borders of the South Africa and its immediate neighbouring territories. To send troops to Europe to support the Commonwealth in World War I, Generals Botha and Smuts created the South African Overseas Expeditionary Force. However, because of the limitations of the Defence Act, they issued a General Order (Order 672 of 1915) which stated that The South African Overseas Expeditionary Force will be Imperial and have the status of regular British Troops. "Status" was meant to imply administrative purposes, as Britain was paying for the maintenance of the force in the field for the sake of local political sensitivities.

On 8 June 1916 the Adjutant General's office at Defence Headquarters issued a note stating:

....the force is raised locally for the purpose of assisting the Imperial Authorities...and it amounts to the Union Government having allowed the Imperial Authorities to recruit men in South Africa for this force.....as it is certainly not raised under the Defence Act of the Union of South Africa, and this being the case, the Union Government can grant no commissions. Any such commissions will be of temporary nature and will lapse at the conclusion of hostilities.

As such, the below colours were awarded to the Unit, but because of the unit being an "Imperial Unit" at the stage of award, the right to bear the colours lapsed at the end of hostilities.

The fifteen "missing" battle honours awarded for service in France and Flanders to the 4th South African Infantry (South African Scottish) battalion include some of the most famous in South Africa's military history:

Battle Honours
Missing Awards
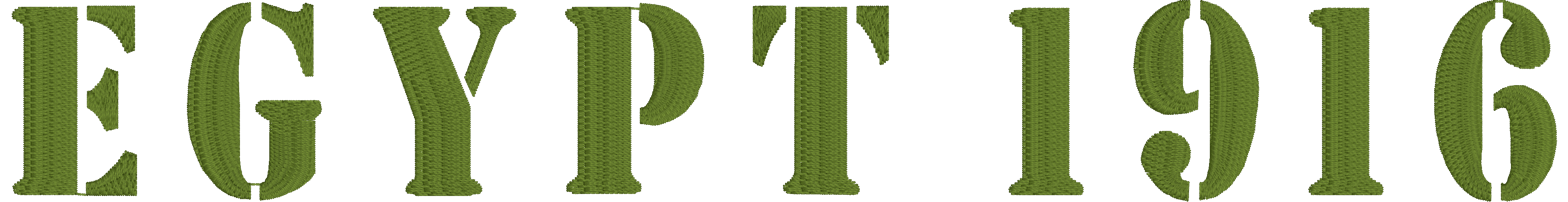
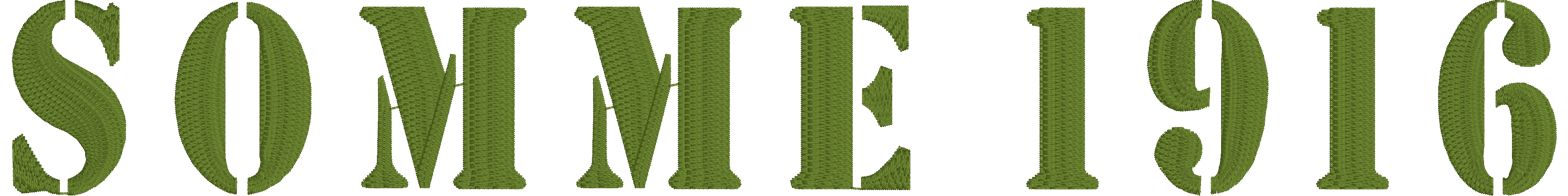
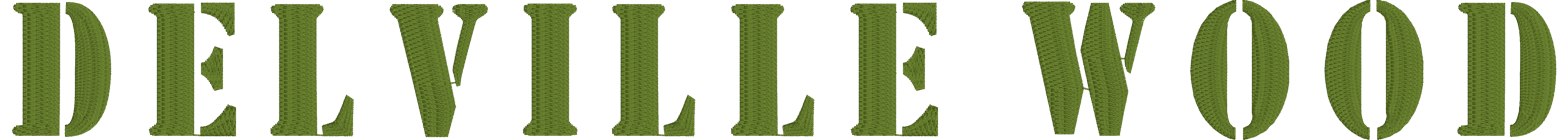
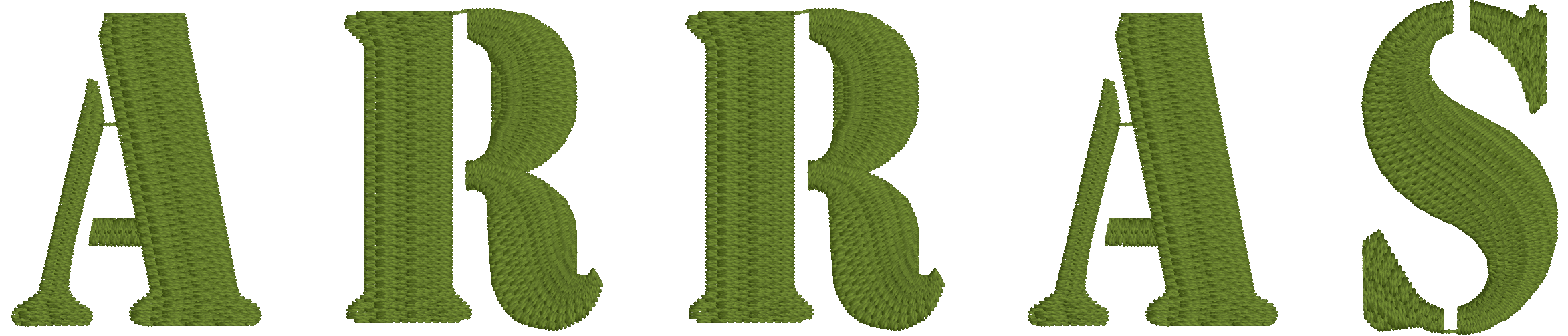
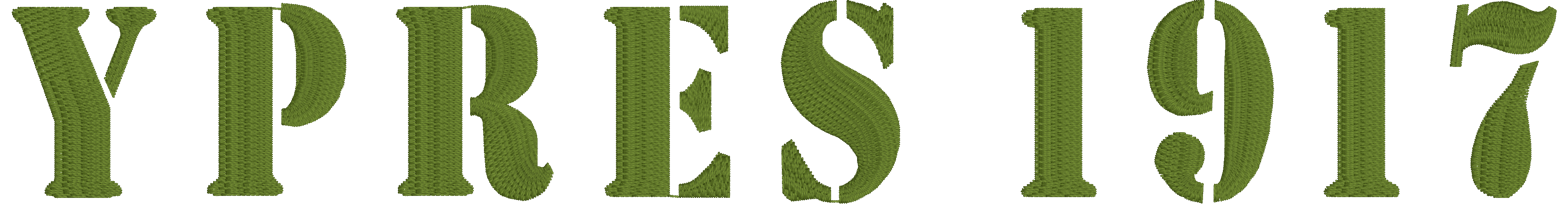
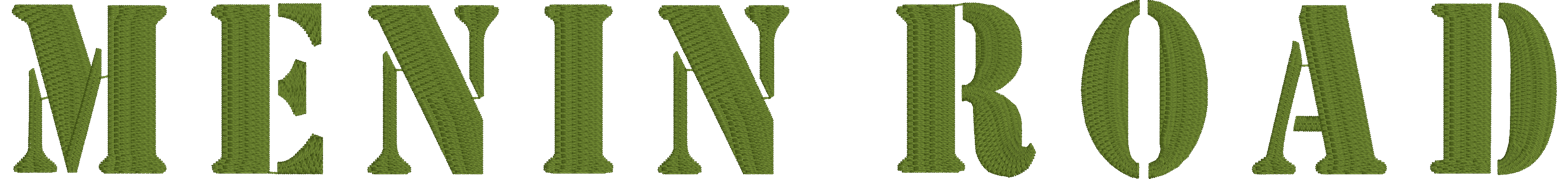
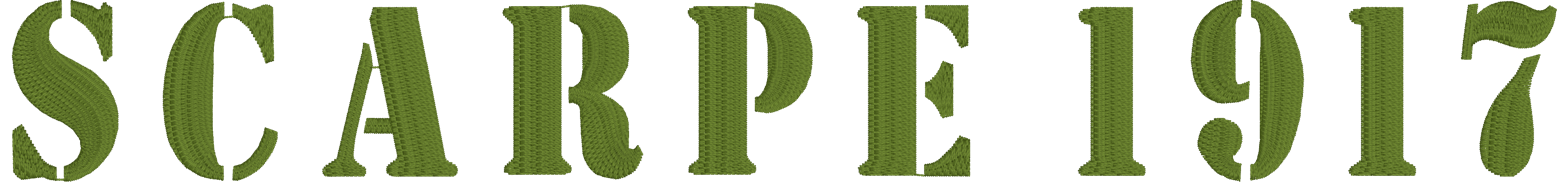

Egypt 1916, Somme 1916, Delville Wood, Arras 1917, Ypres 1917, Menin Road, Messines 1918, Hindenburg Line, Cambrai 1918, Pursuit to Mons, France and Flanders 1918, Le Transloy, Scarpe 1917, Kemmel, Lys

== Leadership ==
Leadership
From	Colonel-In-Chief	To	Ribbon
1906	Duke of Connaught and Strathearn (Note: Later Field Marshal) (Note: Later Governor General of Canada)	1942	
1942	Vacant	1947	
1947	Queen Elizabeth the Queen Mother	1961	
From	Honorary Colonel	To	Ribbon
1906	Col R. Solomon VD	1930	Colonial Auxiliary Forces Officers' Decoration VD
1932	Col H.J.C Stephan	1970	
1972	Col G.W. Thomas JCD,MC	1980	John Chard Decoration JCD Military Cross MC
1984	Vice-Admiral J. Johnson SSA,SM,DSC	n.d.	Star of South Africa SSA Southern Cross Medal SM Distinguished Service Cross (United Kingdom) DSC
From	Colonel of the Regiment	To	Ribbon
n.d.	Col (Hon) Denzil M. Loveland ED	n.d.	Efficiency Decoration (South Africa) ED
n.d.	Col (Hon) P. McLoughlin PVD,SM,MMM	Present	Pro Virtute Decoration PVD Southern Cross Medal SM Military Merit Medal MMM
From	Commanding Officer	To	Ribbon
1885	Maj J. Scott	1890	
1890	Maj D. Baker	1891	
1891	Maj J. Scott	1892	
1892	Lt Col Sir James Sivewright KCMG	1894	Order of St Michael and St George KCMG
1894	Lt Col J. Scott	1895	
1895	Lt Col B.M. Duff ISO,VD	1900	Imperial Service Order ISO Colonial Auxiliary Forces Officers' Decoration VD
1901	Lt Col W. Standford MVO,DSO,VD	1914	Royal Victorian Order MVO Distinguished Service Order DSO Colonial Auxiliary Forces Officers' Decoration VD
1914	Lt Col H.E. Tennant VD	1921	Colonial Auxiliary Forces Officers' Decoration VD
1921	Lt Col J. Cran	1925	
1925	Lt Col R. Hallack	1928	
1928	Lt Col W.D. Hearn MC,VD	1937	Military Cross MC Colonial Auxiliary Forces Officers' Decoration VD
1937	Lt Col H.L. Sumner MC,MM,VD	1941	Military Cross MC Military Medal MM Colonial Auxiliary Forces Officers' Decoration VD
1941	Lt Col W. Crewe-Brown	1942	
12 February 1942	Lt Col S.E.V. Quin	6 May 1942	
7 May 1942	Maj A.S. Duncan	23 July 1942	
24 July 1942	Lt Col S.E.V. Quin MBE	30 April 1943	Order of the British Empire MBE
7 May 1943	Lt Col A.S. Duncan	4 October 1943	
5 October 1943	Lt Col O.N. Flemmer	15 July 1944	
16 July 1944	Lt Col A.S. Duncan DSO	16 April 1945	Distinguished Service Order DSO
1945	Lt Col W.S. Douglas MC,ED	1953	Military Cross MC Efficiency Decoration (South Africa) ED
1953	Lt Col G.W.Thomas JCD,MC	1957	John Chard Decoration JCD Military Cross MC
1957	Lt Col D.M. Loveland ED	1961	Efficiency Decoration (South Africa) ED
1961	Lt Col C. St L. Hone JCD	1966	John Chard Decoration JCD
1966	Lt Col C.C.C. Albertyn JCD	1972	John Chard Decoration JCD
1972	Lt Col C. O'Brien SM	1979	Southern Cross Medal SM
1979	Lt Col D.J. Plane SM	1984	Southern Cross Medal SM
1984	Lt Col A.M. Marriner JCD	1989	John Chard Decoration JCD
1989	Lt Col Bernie Ashlin MMM,JCD	2000	Military Merit Medal MMM John Chard Decoration JCD
2000	Lt Col Brad Geyser MMM,JCD	2006	Military Merit Medal MMM John Chard Decoration JCD
2006	Lt Col Andre van der Bijl	2014	
2014	Lt Col Marthinus Lott	2019	
2019	Lt Col Stephan Pierce	Present	
From	Regimental Sergeant Major	To	Ribbon
1885	J. Walls	1894	
1895	RSM MacFarlane, October (Note: Initials unknown)	1896	
1 February 1896	J. Grant	27 October 1897	
28 September 1887	W. Mitchell (Note: Commissioned during SA War)	11 March 1900	
12 March 1900	W. Matthews	11 March 1901	
12 March 1901	J.A. Windrum (Note: Enlisted in Colonial Regular Forces)	8 July 1901	
1 July 1902	W. Mitchell	30 May 1903	
1904	S.H. Reynard	1911	
1911	H.W. Rochfort	1915	
1915	J. Brennan	1922	
1922	C.F. Windrum	1941	
1942	S.F. Schwormstedt	1943	
1943	G.W.H. West (Note: During FC/CTH amalgamation)	1945	
1946	WO1 S.F. Schwormstedt	1960	
1960	WO1 R.B. Lowton JCD	1969	John Chard Decoration JCD
1970	WO1 B.P. Feldman JCD	1985	John Chard Decoration JCD
1986	WO1 A.H. Silva JCD	1991	John Chard Decoration JCD
1991	WO1 Charles A.R. de Cruz CM,JCD (Note: Later commissioned and promoted to Major)	1999	Army Cross CM John Chard Decoration JCD
1999	WO1 Barry M. Snowball JCD	2006	John Chard Decoration JCD
2006	WO1 Joe Koen JCD	2011	John Chard Decoration JCD
2011	MWO Alfie Wort	2019	
2019	MWO Daantjie Prins	2019	
2019	MWO 'Abie' Abrahams	present	
