= Willem Hechter =

South African Air Force general

Lieutenant General Willem Hendrik Hechter SSAS SD SM MMM
- Born: 26 May 1942 (age 84)
- Military career
- Allegiance: South Africa
- Branch: South African Air Force
- Service years: 1965–2000
- Rank: Lieutenant General
- Commands: Chief of the South African Air Force; AFB Pietersburg; Advanced Flying School; 1 Squadron
- Awards: Star of South Africa SSAS Southern Cross Decoration SD Southern Cross Medal SM Military Merit Medal MMM Pro Patria Medal Southern Africa Medal General Service Medal (South Africa) Good Service Medal

Lieutenant General Willem Hendrik Hechter SSAS SD SM MMM (born 26 May 1942, in East London) is a former Chief of the South African Air Force.

== Military career ==
Hechter joined the SAAF in January 1960 and received his wings in December 1960 at Central Flying School, Dunnottar. He served as Officer Commanding Advanced Flying School, Pietersburg and 1 Squadron before serving as Staff Officer Fighters and Senior Staff Officer Fighters at Air Force Headquarters.

Hechter commanded AFB Pietersburg before serving as Director Force Preparation, Chief of Air Staff Operations and Chief of Air Staff. He was appointed Chief of the Air Force from 1 May 1996.

== Aircraft flown ==
Hechter flew the following aircraft:

- Harvard
- De Havilland Vampire
- Impala
- Canadair Sabre Mk.6
- Mirage III
- Mirage F1CZ

== Awards and decorations ==
Lt Gen Hechter was awarded the following:

- Star of South Africa (Silver) (SSAS)
- Southern Cross Decoration (SD)
- Southern Cross Medal (1975) (SM)
- Military Merit Medal (MMM)
- Pro Patria Medal
- Southern Africa Medal
- General Service Medal (South Africa)
- Unitas (Unity) Medal
- Good Service Medal (Gold (30 Years))
- Good Service Medal (Silver (20 Years))
- Good Service Medal (Bronze (10 Years))

Pilots Wings (Qualification)
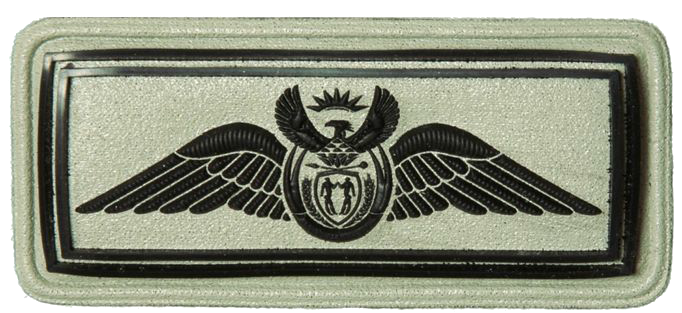
2500 plus hrs. Black on Thatch beige, Embossed. National Coat of Arms with large wings enclosed by two black rectangles

Military offices
Preceded by James Kriel	Chief of the South African Air Force; 1996–2000	Succeeded by Roelf Beukes
Unknown	Chief of Air Staff South African Air Force; 1995–1996	Succeeded by Bertus Burger
Preceded by Zac Repsold	Chief of Air Staff Operations South African Air Force; 1994–1994	Succeeded by Chris Lombard
Preceded by Joep Joubert	Deputy Chief of Staff Operations; 1992–1993	Unknown
