= Chris Roux =

South African military officer

Brigadier General Christiaan Hendrik Roux SM, MMM
- Born: 1952 (age 73–74); Cape Town
- Military career
- Allegiance: South Africa
- Branch: South African Army
- Service years: 1971–2012
- Rank: Brigadier General
- Nickname: Chris
- Unit: 4 Artillery Regiment
- Commands: Director Army Acquisitions, SANDF; GOC Artillery Formation; OC 10 Artillery Brigade; OC 4 Artillery Regiment
- Conflicts: South African Border War
- Awards: Southern Cross Medal SM Military Merit Medal MMM Pro Patria Medal Southern Africa Medal General Service Medal (South Africa) Unitas (Unity) Medal Medalje vir Troue Diens (Medal for Loyal Service) Good Service Medal

Brig Gen Chris Roux SM MMM was a General Officer in the South African Army from the artillery.

== Military career ==
He joined the South African Defence Force in the early seventies. He was an instructor at the South African Army College, Battery Commander at Sierra Battery of 61 Mechanised Battalion Group, OC 10 Artillery Brigade, OC 4 Artillery Regiment, SSO Doctrine at Army Headquarters, Director of Artillery, General Officer Commanding Artillery Formation from 1999 to 2001. Director Army Acquisitions at Acquisitions Division. He retired in 2012.

== Honours and awards ==
=== Medals ===
- Southern Cross Medal (1975) (SM)
- Military Merit Medal (MMM)
- Pro Patria Medal
- Southern Africa Medal
- General Service Medal (South Africa)
- Unitas (Unity) Medal
- Medalje vir Troue Diens (Medal for Loyal Service) (40 Year Clasp)
- Good Service Medal (Gold (30 Years))
- Good Service Medal (Silver (20 Years))
- Good Service Medal (Bronze (10 Years))
- Knight of the National Order of Merit (Gabon)

=== Proficiency badges ===
Master Gunner #72 Master Gunner badge Brigadier General; Chris H. Roux (Note: Post occupied when award was made: General Officer Commanding, Artillery Formation) Year: 2001: ← #71; Colonel; Maarten A. Schalekamp / #73 → Colonel; F.J. Breytenbach	61 Mech Operational Service Badge (Service) Black on Thatch beige, Embossed. Rectangular bar (upright) with a black dagger and three black lightning flashes angled diagonally across the blade

== Notes ==
Military offices
Preceded by Brig Gen Johann Jooste	Director Army Acquisition; 2001–2013	Succeeded by Brig Gen Sydney Mketo
Preceded by New	GOC Artillery Formation; 1999–2001	Succeeded by Brig Gen Abe Notshweleka
Preceded by Cmdt Sarel Buijs	OC 4 Artillery Regiment; 1993–1994	Succeeded by Deon Holtzhausen
Preceded by Col Jean Lausberg	OC 10 Artillery Brigade; 1991–1992	Succeeded by disbanded
Honorary titles
Preceded by Col Maarten Schalekamp	72nd Master Gunner; 1999	Succeeded by WO1 Jacques Niemand
