= Air Force Memorial =

Air Force Memorial may refer to:

- United States Air Force Memorial in Arlington, Virginia
- Air Forces Memorial in Runnymede, England
- Royal Air Force Memorial (Albany, Georgia)
- Royal Australian Air Force Memorial, Canberra
- Royal Australian Air Force Memorial, Brisbane
- South African Air Force Memorial
