= Air Force Cross =

Air Force Cross may refer to:

- Air Force Cross (South Africa)
- Air Force Cross (United Kingdom)
- Air Force Cross (United States)
