= Roelf Beukes =

South African military commander

Lieutenant General Roelof Beukes SD SM MMM
- Born: Pretoria, Gauteng
- Military career
- Allegiance: South Africa
- Branch: South African Air Force
- Service years: 1969–2005
- Rank: Lieutenant General
- Nickname: Roelf
- Commands: Chief of the South African Air Force; OC 2 Squadron SAAF
- Awards: Chilean Air Force Merit Medal

Lieutenant-General Roelf Beukes SD SM MMM is a retired South African military commander. He joined the South African Air Force in 1969 and later served as Chief of the Air Force.

== Military career ==
Beukes attended the South African Military Academy from 1966 to 1969. He completed the Senior Command and Staff Course at the Chilean Air War Academy, Santiago, from 1979 to 1980. He remained in Chile to serve as a pilot instructor.

== Aircraft Flown ==
During his career he flew the following aircraft:

- Harvard
- De Havilland Vampire
- Sabre
- Impala
- Mirage III
- Cheetah D

== Awards and honours ==
- Southern Cross Decoration (SD)
- Southern Cross Medal (1975) (SM)
- Military Merit Medal (MMM)
- Pro Patria Medal
- General Service Medal (South Africa)
- Good Service Medal (Gold (30 Years))
- Good Service Medal (Silver (20 Years))
- Good Service Medal (Bronze (10 Years))
- Chilean Air Force Merit Medal

Pilots Wings (Qualification)
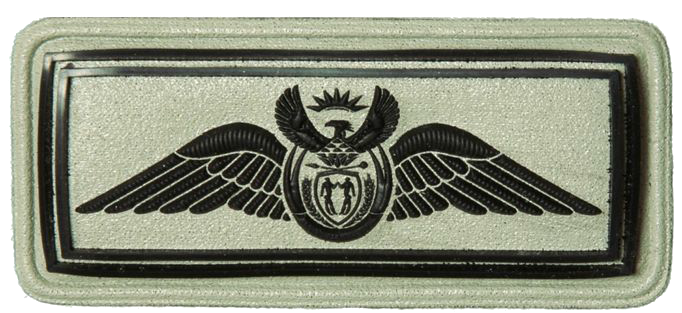
2500 plus hrs. Black on Thatch beige, Embossed. National Coat of Arms with large wings enclosed by two black rectangles

Military offices
Preceded by Willem Hechter	Chief of the South African Air Force; 2000–2005	Succeeded by Carlo Gagiano
New title Established	GOC Air Command; 1999–2000	Succeeded by MP Janse van Rensburg
Preceded by Ollie Holmes	Inspector General South African Air Force; 1996–1998	Succeeded by JL Somerville
Preceded by Johan Retief	Military Secretary to Minister of Defence; 1992–1994	Succeeded by Derrick Mgwebi
