= South African Air Force Memorial =

Memorial to South African Air Force (SAAF) members

- South Africa
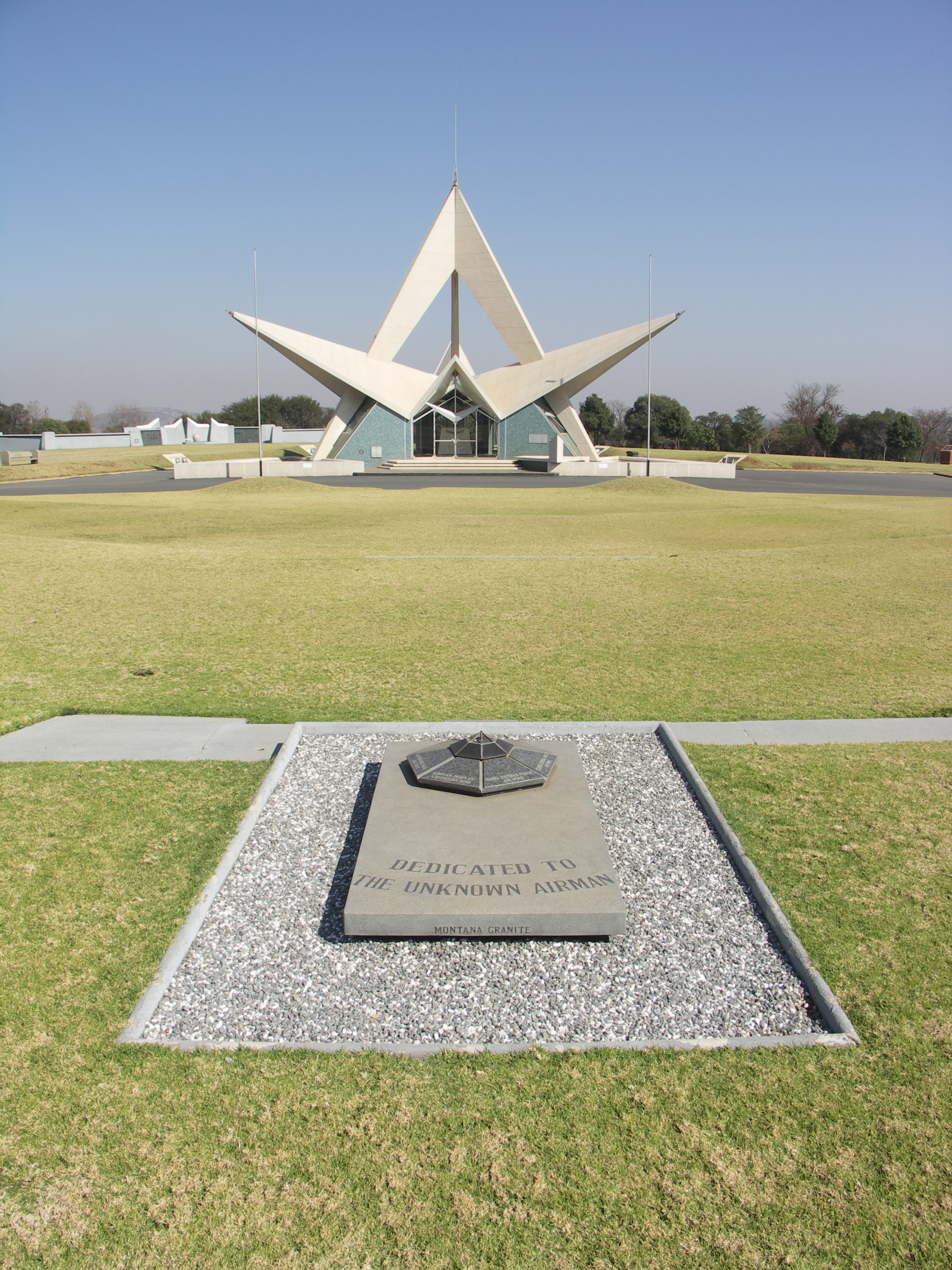
- The SAAF Memorial at Swartkop, Pretoria
- For All South African Air Force casualties Joint Air Training Scheme casualties South African casualties of the Korean War
- Established: 1 September 1963
- Location: 25°47′57.9″S 28°10′9.7″E near Centurion, Gauteng

The South African Air Force Memorial is a memorial to South African Air Force (SAAF) members who have died whilst in service of the South African Air Corps and its successor, the South African Air Force from 1915 to the present during times of war and times of peace. The memorial is located on Bays Hill in Swartkop outside Pretoria and overlooks Air Force Base Swartkop, the first air force base of the SAAF. An annual memorial service is traditionally held here in May.

The memorial was unveiled 1 September 1963 by State President of South Africa, Charles Robberts Swart. The unveiling ceremony was attended by 5000 people.

== History ==
During 1945, the SAAF Association undertook to bear all costs for the erection and maintenance of the Memorial. The National Executive Committee of the SAAF Association decided in April 1949 to proceed with fund-raising. The total projected budget for the erection was R3,000. The NEC recorded its requirements at a resolution taken on 7 December 1949. The Pretoria Branch of the Association was then approached to have the Memorial erected and inaugurated on May 31, 1950. A sub-committee consisting of Col HB George, Jock Reid and RF Bell (convener) was appointed. Other members who became closely involved in various capacities were Normie MacRobert, Dr John Leppan, Reg Dennett, and Dave Hastie.

An architectural design competition, run by the Institute of South African Architects, attracted 38 entries and one of these was selected as the design for the SAAF memorial. The architectural design competition was won by a small firm of architects called Taylor and Taylor, with the head of design John Taylor. Construction of the Memorial started in May 1962 and Transvaal Construction, of which Mr Henk Muuren was the principal director, achieved a good standard of work, in spite of the complexities of the reinforced concrete structure. Great care was taken to use as much local material such as Granite from Namaqualand and Stinkwood from Knysna. Construction was completed within 11 months at a cost of R16,000 for the reinforced foundation and R57,000 for the memorial itself. The construction costs were partially funded by donations from British Aerospace Limited and the Society of British Aircraft Constructions Limited.

The shape of the memorial, consisting of three wings that cross over one another, is intended to symbolise flight. The wings each cover separate rooms that house a chapel, a caretakers office and a machine room. The hall between the wings houses a cenotaph as the centrepiece of the memorial and the rolls of honour.

The SAAF Memorial was not the first memorial dedicated to members of the South African Air Force. A smaller one was located outside Waterkloof Air Station from 1950 to 1962.

== Additional memorials ==
The memorial site has been expanded over the years with additional memorials added. A memorial wall listing past members of the SAAF was unveiled by Lieutenant General Roelf Beukes on 6 May 2001, and a Garden of Remembrance, which contains ashes of former SAAF members, opened on 7 May 2004. Any "bone-fides member" of the South African Air Force or the South African Air Force Association can qualify to have his or her ashes stored in a special niche in the garden; the ashes of the member's spouses or partners may also be stored in an adjacent niche.

A memorial to the Unknown Airman was inaugurated by General Siphiwe Nyanda on 7 May 2004. The Garden of Remembrance and memorial wall had originally been suggested by the South African Air Force Association in 1991, when it was celebrating its 50th anniversary.
