= Pro Merito Medal (1975) =

Discontinued South African military decoration

- Type: Military decoration for merit
- Awarded for: Exceptionally meritorious service and particular devotion to duty
- Country: South Africa
- Presented by: the State President and, from 1994, the President
- Eligibility: Other ranks
- Post-nominals: PMM
- Status: Discontinued in 2003
- Established: 1975
- First award: 1976
- 1975 and 1986 ribbon bars

SADF pre-1994 & SANDF post-2002 orders of wear
- Next (higher): SADF precedence: Southern Cross Medal (1975); SANDF precedence: Southern Cross Medal (1975)
- Next (lower): SADF succession: Danie Theron Medal; SANDF succession: Defence Force Merit Medal

The Pro Merito Medal of 1975, post-nominal letters PMM, is a military decoration which was instituted by the Republic of South Africa on 1 July 1975. It was awarded to other ranks of the South African Defence Force for exceptionally meritorious service and particular devotion to duty, and was the non-commissioned officers' version of the Southern Cross Medal of 1975 (SM).

== The South African military ==
The Union Defence Forces (UDF) were established in 1912 and renamed the South African Defence Force (SADF) in 1958. On 27 April 1994, it was integrated with six other independent forces into the South African National Defence Force (SANDF).

== Institution ==
The Pro Merito Medal of 1975, post-nominal letters PMM, was instituted by the State President on 1 July 1975 and replaced the Pro Merito Medal of 1967.

== Award criteria ==
The medal could be awarded to other ranks of the South African Defence Force for exceptionally meritorious service and particular devotion to duty. The use of post-nominal letters by all recipients was allowed from 1993. A Bar, instituted in 1993 as well, could be awarded in recognition of further similar displays of meritorious service and devotion to duty. Although not prescribed, the practice was generally that recipients must already have received the Military Merit Medal (MMM).

== Order of wear ==
The position of the Pro Merito Medal of 1975 in the official order of precedence was revised three times after 1975, to accommodate the inclusion or institution of new decorations and medals, first upon the integration into the South African National Defence Force on 27 April 1994, again when decorations and medals were belatedly instituted in April 1996 for the two former non-statutory forces, the Azanian People's Liberation Army and Umkhonto we Sizwe, and again when a new series of military orders, decorations and medals was instituted in South Africa on 27 April 2003. Its position remained unchanged, as it was on 27 April 1994, upon the latter two occasions.

South African Defence Force until 26 April 1994

- Official SADF order of precedence:
  - Preceded by the Southern Cross Medal (1975) (SM).
  - Succeeded by the Danie Theron Medal (DTM).
- Official national order of precedence:
  - Preceded by the Southern Cross Medal (1975) (SM).
  - Succeeded by the Department of Correctional Services Medal for Merit (Officers).

South African National Defence Force from 27 April 1994

- Official SANDF order of precedence:
  - Preceded by the Southern Cross Medal (1975) (SM) of the Republic of South Africa.
  - Succeeded by the Defence Force Merit Medal of the Republic of Bophuthatswana.
- Official national order of precedence:
  - Preceded by the Southern Cross Medal (1975) (SM) of the Republic of South Africa.
  - Succeeded by the Department of Correctional Services Medal for Merit (Officers) of the Republic of South Africa.

== Description ==
Obverse

The Pro Merito Medal of 1975 was struck in silver, to fit in a circle 38 millimetres in diameter, and is 3 millimetres thick at the centre. It depicts a disa uniflora on a framed roundel, in the centre of a starburst of radiating points on the obverse.

Reverse

The pre-1994 South African Coat of Arms is on the reverse, with the decoration number stamped underneath.

Pro Merito Medal and Bar

Bar

The Bar was struck in silver and has a Protea emblem embossed in the centre. The same bar was used to indicate multiple awards of the Pro Virtute Medal, Army Cross, Air Force Cross, Navy Cross, Medical Service Cross, Southern Cross Medal (1975) and Pro Merito Medal (1975).

Ribbons

The original ribbon was 32 millimetres wide, with a 2 millimetres wide white band and a 12 millimetres wide dark blue band, repeated in reverse order and separated by a 4 millimetres wide white band in the centre.

It was replaced by a new ribbon in 1986, 32 millimetres wide, with a 6½ millimetres wide white band and a 7 millimetres wide dark blue band, repeated in reverse order and separated by a 5 millimetres wide white band in the centre.

== Discontinuation ==
Conferment of the decoration was discontinued in respect of services performed on or after 27 April 2003, when the Southern Cross Medal and the Pro Merito Medal were both replaced by the iPhrothiya yeSiliva decoration.
