= Jack Hindon Medal =

- Type: Military decoration for merit
- Awarded for: Exceptionally diligent and outstanding service
- Country: South Africa
- Presented by: the State President
- Eligibility: Other ranks in the Commandos
- Post-nominals: JHM
- Status: Discontinued in 1975
- Established: 1970
- First award: 1971
- Final award: 1975

Highlights
- Total: 18
- Ribbon bar

SADF pre-1994 & SANDF post-2002 orders of wear
- Next (higher): SADF precedence: Danie Theron Medal; SANDF precedence: Danie Theron Medal
- Next (lower): SADF succession: Military Merit Medal; SANDF succession: Military Merit Medal
- Related: Danie Theron Medal

The Jack Hindon Medal, post-nominal letters JHM, is a South African military decoration which was instituted in the Republic of South Africa in 1970 and which was only in use until 1975. It was awarded to other ranks for diligent service in the Commandos, the rural defence component of the South African Defence Force.

== The South African military ==
The Union Defence Forces (UDF) were established in 1912 and renamed the South African Defence Force (SADF) in 1958. On 27 April 1994, it was integrated with six other independent forces into the South African National Defence Force (SANDF).

== Institution ==
The Jack Hindon Medal, post-nominal letters JHM, was instituted by the State President in 1970.

== Award criteria ==
The medal could be awarded to other ranks of the Commandos, the rural defence component of the South African Defence Force, for exceptionally diligent and outstanding service. The medal was named after Jack Hindon, a Scottish-born Afrikaner hero of the Second Boer War. The use of post-nominal letters was allowed from 1993, eighteen years after the medal had been discontinued.

== Order of wear ==
The position of the Jack Hindon Medal in the official order of precedence was revised three times after 1975, to accommodate the inclusion or institution of new decorations and medals, first upon the integration into the South African National Defence Force on 27 April 1994, again in April 1996, when decorations and medals were belatedly instituted for the two former non-statutory forces, the Azanian People's Liberation Army and Umkhonto we Sizwe, and finally upon the institution of a new set of awards on 27 April 2003. It remained unchanged on all three occasions.

Official SANDF order of precedence

- Preceded by the Danie Theron Medal (DTM).
- Succeeded by the Military Merit Medal (MMM).

Official national order of precedence

- Preceded by the Danie Theron Medal (DTM).
- Succeeded by the Military Merit Medal (MMM).

== Description ==
Obverse

The Jack Hindon Medal is an oval bronze medal, to fit in a circle 38 millimetres in diameter, and depicts three Burghers raising the Vierkleur flag on top of Spioenkop after the Boer victory over British forces in 1900, during the Second Boer War. It is inscribed "JACK • HINDON" at the top and "MEDALJE • MEDAL" at the bottom.

Reverse

The reverse shows the pre-1994 South African Coat of Arms.

Ribbon

The ribbon is 32 millimetres wide and yellow, with 4½ millimetres wide green bands on the edges and a 1 millimetre wide green band in the centre. The green and yellow colours have their origin in the ribbon colours of the three awards which were belatedly instituted in 1920, as retrospective awards for Boer veteran officers and men of the Second Boer War of 1899–1902, the Dekoratie voor Trouwe Dienst, the Medalje voor de Anglo-Boere Oorlog and the Lint voor Verwonding. For these three awards, these two colours had been gazetted as green and orange, but the orange appeared as yellow on the actual ribbons.

== Discontinuation ==
Conferment of the Jack Hindon Medal was discontinued in 1975 and the Danie Theron Medal (DTM), hitherto reserved for officers, became available for all ranks in the Commandos.
