= Royal Air Force Memorial (Albany, Georgia) =

Coordinates: 31°36′0.1″N 84°11′43.1″W

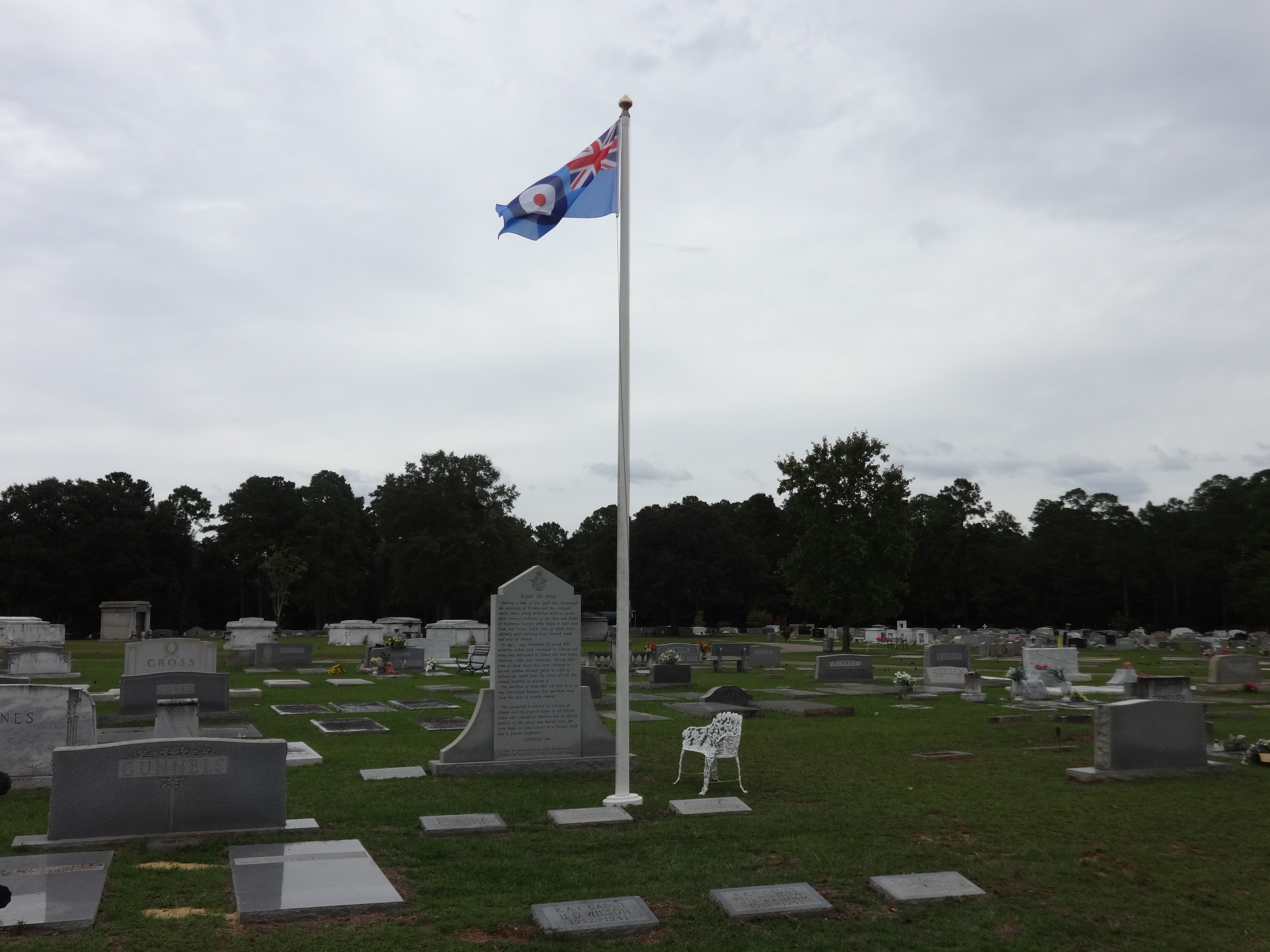
Royal Air Force Memorial, Crown Hill Cemetery, Albany

The Royal Air Force Memorial in Albany, Georgia, United States, honors the British Royal Air Force Cadets buried in Albany and stands as a memorial to all British cadets who trained in the U.S. during World War II. It is located in Crown Hill Cemetery.

== See also ==
- War memorial
