= Danie Theron Medal =

Military decoration of the Republic of South Africa

- Type: Military decoration for merit
- Awarded for: Exceptionally diligent and outstanding service
- Country: South Africa
- Presented by: the State President
- Eligibility: Members of the Commandos * Officers only from 1970 to 1975 * All ranks after 1975
- Post-nominals: DTM
- Status: Discontinued in 1993
- Established: 1970
- First award: 1971
- Ribbon bar

SADF pre-1994 & SANDF post-2002 orders of wear
- Next (higher): SADF precedence: Pro Merito Medal (1975); SANDF precedence: iPhrothiya yeSiliva
- Next (lower): SADF succession: Jack Hindon Medal; SANDF succession: Jack Hindon Medal

The Danie Theron Medal, post-nominal letters DTM, is a military decoration which was instituted by the Republic of South Africa in 1970 and which was in use until 1993. It was awarded for diligent service in the Commandos, the rural defence component of the South African Defence Force. Originally reserved for officers, it was available to all ranks from 1975.

== The South African military ==
The Union Defence Forces (UDF) were established in 1912 and renamed the South African Defence Force (SADF) in 1958. On 27 April 1994, it was integrated with six other independent forces into the South African National Defence Force (SANDF).

== Institution ==
The Danie Theron Medal, post-nominal letters DTM, was instituted by the State President in 1970.

== Award criteria ==
The medal could be awarded, in times of peace or war, to members of the Commandos, the rural defence component of the South African Defence Force, for exceptionally diligent and outstanding service. The medal was named after Danie Theron, a legendary Boer scout and guerilla warrior who fought valiantly in the Second Boer War.

Further conditions were that the recipient must be a South African citizen who had completed ten years service in the SADF and who had not yet received an award for devotion to duty or diligent service.

From 1970 to 1975, the Danie Theron Medal was awarded to officers only, since the Jack Hindon Medal (JHM) was the equivalent award for other ranks. When the Jack Hindon Medal was discontinued in 1975, the Danie Theron Medal became available for award to all ranks.

== Order of wear ==
The position of the Danie Theron Medal in the official order of precedence was revised three times after 1975, to accommodate the inclusion or institution of new decorations and medals, first upon the integration into the South African National Defence Force on 27 April 1994, again in April 1996, when decorations and medals were belatedly instituted for the two former non-statutory forces, the Azanian People's Liberation Army and Umkhonto we Sizwe, and finally upon the institution of a new set of awards on 27 April 2003.

South African Defence Force until 26 April 1994

- Official SADF order of precedence:
  - Preceded by the Pro Merito Medal of 1975 (PMM).
  - Succeeded by the Jack Hindon Medal (JHM).
- Official national order of precedence:
  - Preceded by the Department of Correctional Services Medal for Merit (Non-Commissioned Officers).
  - Succeeded by the Jack Hindon Medal (JHM).

South African National Defence Force from 27 April 1994

- Official SANDF order of precedence:
  - Preceded by the Marumo Medal, Class I of the Republic of Bophuthatswana.
  - Succeeded by the Jack Hindon Medal (JHM) of the Republic of South Africa.
- Official national order of precedence:
  - Preceded by the Correctional Services Medal for Merit (Non-Commissioned Officers) of the KwaZulu Homeland.
  - Succeeded by the Jack Hindon Medal (JHM) of the Republic of South Africa.

South African National Defence Force from April 1996

- Official SANDF order of precedence:
  - Preceded by the Silver Medal for Merit (SMM) of the Azanian People's Liberation Army.
  - Succeeded by the Jack Hindon Medal (JHM) of the Republic of South Africa.
- Official national order of precedence:
  - Preceded by the Correctional Services Medal for Merit (Non-Commissioned Officers) of the KwaZulu Homeland.
  - Succeeded by the Jack Hindon Medal (JHM) of the Republic of South Africa.

South African National Defence Force from 27 April 2003

- Official SANDF order of precedence:
  - Preceded by the iPhrothiya yeSiliva (PS) of the Republic of South Africa.
  - Succeeded by the Jack Hindon Medal (JHM) of the Republic of South Africa.
- Official national order of precedence:
  - Preceded by the Correctional Services Medal for Merit (Non-Commissioned Officers) of the KwaZulu Homeland.
  - Succeeded by the Jack Hindon Medal (JHM) of the Republic of South Africa.

== Description ==
Obverse

The Danie Theron Medal is a medallion struck in silver, 38 millimetres in diameter and 3 millimetres thick, depicting an eagle raising its wings on the obverse, inscribed "DANIE THERON" around the perimeter at the top and "MEDALJE • MEDAL" at the bottom.

Reverse

The pre-1994 South African Coat of Arms is on the reverse. The decoration number was impressed at the bottom of the medal on the rim.

Ribbon

The ribbon is 32 millimetres wide and green, with three 4 millimetres wide yellow bands, spaced 5 millimeters apart in the centre. The green and yellow colours have their origin in the ribbon colours of the three awards which were belatedly instituted in 1920, as retrospective awards for Boer veteran officers and men of the Second Boer War of 1899–1902, the Dekoratie voor Trouwe Dienst, the Medalje voor de Anglo-Boere Oorlog and the Lint voor Verwonding. For these three awards, these two colours had been gazetted as green and orange, but the orange appeared as yellow on the actual ribbons.

== Discontinuation ==
Conferment of the decoration was discontinued in respect of services performed after 1993.
