= Pro Virtute Medal =

- Type: Military decoration for bravery
- Awarded for: Distinguished conduct and outstanding combat leadership in the field
- Country: South Africa
- Presented by: the State President
- Eligibility: Other Ranks
- Post-nominals: PVM
- Status: Discontinued in 2003
- Established: 1987
- First award: Never awarded
- Ribbon bar

The Pro Virtute Medal, post-nominal letters PVM, was a military decoration for bravery that was instituted by the Republic of South Africa in 1987, but never awarded. The decoration was intended for award to other ranks of the South African Defence Force for distinguished conduct and outstanding combat leadership in the field.

== Institution ==
The Pro Virtute Medal, post-nominal letters PVM, was instituted by the State President in 1987.

== Award criteria ==
The medal could be awarded to other ranks of the South African Defence Force for distinguished conduct and outstanding combat leadership in the field. A bar, instituted in 1993, could be awarded in recognition of further similar displays of combat leadership in the field.

== Description ==
Rejected specimen

The first proof version, which was rejected, demonstrated that a two-dimensional paper drawing does not always translate to a three-dimensional metal object successfully. The second version, which was accepted, had the arms of the cross and the central roundel embowed.

Obverse

The Pro Virtute Medal was a silver medallion, 38 millimetres in diameter, depicting a five-armed Maltese cross with one arm pointing down and a raised roundel, framed by three rings, in the centre.

Reverse

The reverse had the pre-1994 South African Coat of Arms over the words "PRO VIRTUTE", framed by a laurel wreath.

Pro Virtute Medal and Bar

Bar

The bar was struck in silver and had an emblem depicting a Protea embossed in the centre. The same bar was used to indicate multiple awards of the Army Cross, Air Force Cross, Navy Cross, Medical Service Cross, Southern Cross Medal (1975) and Pro Merito Medal (1975).

Ribbon

The ribbon was 32 millimetres wide and orange, with two pale blue bands, each 4 millimetres wide and spaced 4 millimetres apart.

== Discontinuation ==
The decoration was never awarded and now never will be. Conferment of the Pro Virtute Medal was officially discontinued in respect of services performed on or after 27 April 2003.
