= Medical Service Cross =

- Type: Military decoration for bravery
- Awarded for: Exceptional courage, leadership, or skill in dangerous or critical situations
- Country: South Africa
- Presented by: the State President and, from 1994, the President
- Eligibility: South African Medical Service members
- Post-nominals: CC
- Status: Discontinued in 2003
- Established: 1987
- Ribbon bar

SADF pre-1994 & SANDF post-2002 orders of wear
- Next (higher): SADF precedence: Navy Cross; SANDF precedence: Navy Cross
- Next (lower): SADF succession: Southern Cross Medal (1952); SANDF succession: Southern Cross Medal (1952)

The Medical Service Cross, post-nominal letters CC (Crux Curationis), is a military decoration which was instituted by the Republic of South Africa in 1987. It was awarded to members of the South African Medical Service for bravery. The Medical Service Cross was discontinued in 2003, but backdated awards can still be made for acts of bravery during this period.

== The South African military ==
The Union Defence Forces (UDF) were established in 1912 and renamed the South African Defence Force (SADF) in 1958. On 27 April 1994, it was integrated with six other independent forces into the South African National Defence Force (SANDF).

== Institution ==
The Medical Service Cross, post-nominal letters CC (Crux Curationis), was instituted by the State President in 1987.

== Award criteria ==
The cross was initially awarded for exceptional ingenuity, resourcefulness and skill, and extraordinary leadership, dedication, sense of duty and personal example and courage in mortal danger in non-combatant situations. After 1993, the award criteria were altered to exceptional courage, leadership, skill, ingenuity or tenacity in dangerous or critical situations. A Bar, instituted in 1993, could be awarded in recognition of further similar displays of courage in danger.

== Order of wear ==
The position of the Medical Service Cross in the official order of precedence was revised three times after 1975, to accommodate the inclusion or institution of new decorations and medals, first upon the integration into the South African National Defence Force on 27 April 1994, again in April 1996 when decorations and medals were belatedly instituted for the two former non-statutory forces, the Azanian People's Liberation Army and Umkhonto we Sizwe, and finally upon the institution of a new set of awards on 27 April 2003, but it remained unchanged on all three occasions.

Official SANDF order of precedence

- Preceded by the Navy Cross (CN) of the Republic of South Africa.
- Succeeded by the Southern Cross Medal (1952) (SM) of the Republic of South Africa.

Official national order of precedence

- Preceded by the Navy Cross (CN) of the Republic of South Africa.
- Succeeded by the Southern Cross Medal (1952) (SM) of the Republic of South Africa.

== Description ==
Obverse

The Medical Service Cross is a pointed cross, struck in silver, to fit in a circle 45 millimetres in diameter, with the South African Medical Service emblem, the Rod of Aesculapius, in the centre on a ruby red roundel, 18 millimetres in diameter.

Reverse

The reverse has the pre-1994 South African Coat of Arms, with the decoration number stamped underneath.

Medical Service Cross and Bar

Bar

The Bar was struck in silver and has an emblem depicting a Protea embossed in the centre. The same Bar was used to indicate multiple awards of the Pro Virtute Medal, Army Cross, Air Force Cross, Navy Cross, Medical Service Cross, Southern Cross Medal (1975) and Pro Merito Medal (1975).

Ribbon

The ribbon is 32 millimetres wide and white, with a 12 millimetres wide ruby red centre band.

== Discontinuation ==
Conferment of the decoration was discontinued in respect of services performed on or after 27 April 2003.
