= Army Cross =

- Type: Military decoration for bravery
- Awarded for: Exceptional courage, leadership, or skill in dangerous or critical situations
- Country: South Africa
- Presented by: the State President and, from 1994, the President
- Eligibility: South African Army members
- Post-nominals: CM
- Status: Discontinued in 2003
- Established: 1987
- First award: 1992
- Ribbon bar

SADF pre-1994 & SANDF post-2002 orders of wear
- Next (higher): SADF precedence: Ad Astra Decoration; SANDF precedence: Ad Astra Decoration
- Next (lower): SADF succession: Air Force Cross; SANDF succession: Air Force Cross

The Army Cross, post-nominal letters CM (Crux Militaria), is a military decoration which was instituted by the Republic of South Africa in 1987. It was awarded to members of the South African Army for bravery. The Army Cross was discontinued in 2003, but backdated awards can still be made for acts of bravery during this period.

== The South African military ==
The Union Defence Forces (UDF) were established in 1912 and renamed the South African Defence Force (SADF) in 1958. On 27 April 1994 it was integrated with six other independent forces into the South African National Defence Force (SANDF).

== Institution ==
The Army Cross, post-nominal letters CM (Crux Militaria), was instituted by the State President in 1987.

== Award criteria ==
The cross was initially awarded for exceptional ingenuity, resourcefulness and skill, and extraordinary leadership, dedication, sense of duty and personal example and courage in mortal danger in non-combatant situations. After 1993, it was awarded for exceptional courage, leadership, skill, ingenuity or tenacity in dangerous or critical situations. A Bar, instituted in 1993, could be awarded in recognition of further similar displays of courage, leadership, skill, ingenuity or tenacity in danger.

It was first awarded in 1992, to Corporal D.H. Maritz and Private H.B. Smit, who recovered a disabled tank during a battle in Angola.

== Order of wear ==
The position of the Army Cross in the official order of precedence was revised three times, to accommodate the institution or addition of new decorations and medals, first upon the integration into the South African National Defence Force on 27 April 1994, again when decorations and medals were belatedly instituted in April 1996 for the two former non-statutory forces, the Azanian People's Liberation Army and Umkhonto we Sizwe, and again when a new series of military decorations and medals was instituted in South Africa on 27 April 2003, but it remained unchanged on all three occasions.

Official SANDF order of precedence

- Preceded by the Ad Astra Decoration (AAD).
- Succeeded by the Air Force Cross (CA).

Official national order of precedence

- Preceded by the Ad Astra Decoration (AAD).
- Succeeded by the Air Force Cross (CA).

== Description ==
Obverse

The Army Cross is a pointed cross, struck in silver, to fit in a circle 45 millimetres in diameter, with the South African Army springbok emblem in the centre on a red roundel, 18 millimetres in diameter.

Reverse

The reverse has the pre-1994 South African Coat of Arms, with the decoration number impressed underneath.

Army Cross and Bar

Bar

The Bar was struck in silver and has an emblem, depicting a Protea, embossed in the centre. The same bar was used to indicate multiple awards of the Pro Virtute Medal, Army Cross, Air Force Cross, Navy Cross, Medical Service Cross, Southern Cross Medal (1975) and Pro Merito Medal (1975).

Ribbon

The ribbon is 32 millimetres wide and white, with a 12 millimetres wide Army orange centre band.

== Discontinuation ==
Conferment of the decoration was discontinued in respect of services performed on or after 27 April 2003.

== Recipients ==
Since inclusion in the table itself is impractical, the actions cited for follow below the table. The list of recipients is not complete.

CM no.	Name	Rank	Unit	Date of action
	Maritz, D.H. (Note: Maritz and Smit – Recovered a disabled tank during a battle in Angola.)	Cpl		
	Smit, H.B.	Pte		
	Berkenshaw, Clive (Note: Berkenshaw, de Cruz, Blake, Carstensen and Evert – Ensured the safety of personnel and equipment during a veld fire at the Army Combat School at Lohatla.)	WO	Cape Town Highlanders	1990
20	de Cruz, Charles	WO	Cape Town Highlanders	1990
	Blake, Sean	Gnr	Cape Town Highlanders	1990
	Carstensen, Riaan	Gnr	Cape Town Highlanders	1990
	Evert, Pieter	Gnr	Cape Town Highlanders	1990
	Fourie, Theunis (Note: Fourie, Theunis – Rescued two policemen from drowning in a flooded river at Rorkes Drift.)	Lt	Stellenbosch University Military Unit	26 Dec 1994
	van Noordwyk, W.	Lt Col		2003
