= Air Force Cross (South Africa) =

- Type: Military decoration for bravery
- Awarded for: Exceptional courage, leadership, or skill in dangerous or critical situations
- Country: South Africa
- Presented by: the State President of South Africa (1987–1994) and the President of South Africa (1994–2003)
- Eligibility: South African Air Force members
- Post-nominals: CA
- Status: Discontinued
- Established: 1987
- First award: 1991
- Final award: 2003
- Ribbon bar

Precedence
- Next (higher): Army Cross
- Next (lower): Navy Cross

The Air Force Cross, post-nominal letters CA (Crux Aeronautica), is a South African military decoration which was instituted by the Republic of South Africa in 1987. It was awarded to members of the South African Air Force for bravery. The decoration was discontinued in 2003, but backdated awards can still be made for acts of bravery during this period.

== The South African military ==
The Union Defence Forces (UDF) were established in 1912 and renamed the South African Defence Force (SADF) in 1958. On 27 April 1994, it was integrated with six other independent forces into the South African National Defence Force (SANDF).

== The Air Force Cross ==
When a new South African set of decorations and medals was instituted on 6 April 1952, to replace most of the British awards which had been used to date, South African equivalents of, amongst others, the British Distinguished Flying Cross (DFC) and Air Force Cross (AFC), were omitted. This omission was only belatedly addressed near the end of the 1966-1989 Border War, when the institution of the Air Force Cross (CA) was proposed.

As proposed, the decoration was intended for award only to air crew, who displayed exceptional courage and leadership during dangerous or critical situations while airborne, where an award for bravery was not suitable, based on the premise that bravery involves knowingly entering mortal danger from a position of relative safety, as opposed to skillfully reacting to an unforeseen situation of mortal danger. The proposed criteria were described in the draft warrant as excellent airmanship or outstanding ingenuity or skill during emergencies or unusual situations in the air.

- One incident which eventually led to the proposed decoration, was an in-flight malfunction in a Canberra B(1) Mk. 12 which disabled the aircraft's control column. In spite of advice from the ground to ditch the aircraft, since the pilot would be unlikely to be able to land it safely, he managed to land it at Air Force Base Waterkloof with minimal damage, while having only trim, rudder and engine power adjustments as controls.
- Another example was a Dakota C-47, which lost its rudder and elevators when struck by a surface-to-air missile, whose commander managed to land safely at Air Force Base Grootfontein by having his passengers, most of them serving General and Flag Officers, move forward and backward in the cabin, as required, to alter the aircraft's centre of gravity.

When the other three Arms of the Service subsequently proposed that an Army Cross (CM), a Navy Cross (CN) and a Medical Service Cross (CC) should be instituted simultaneously, the proposed award criteria of all four crosses were amended to outstanding ingenuity or skill in the utilisation and control of personnel, weaponry or other equipment in dangerous situations and, in the case of the Air Force Cross, not necessarily restricted to flying.

== Institution ==
The Air Force Cross, post-nominal letters CA (Crux Aeronautica), was instituted by the State President in 1987.

== Award criteria ==
The cross was initially awarded for exceptional ingenuity, resourcefulness and skill, and extraordinary leadership, dedication, sense of duty and personal example and courage in mortal danger, in non-combatant situations. After 1993, the Cross was awarded for exceptional courage, leadership, skill, ingenuity or tenacity in dangerous or critical situations. A Bar, instituted in 1993, could be awarded in recognition of further similar displays of courage, leadership, skill, ingenuity or tenacity in danger.

The Air Force Cross was first awarded in 1991, to 27 Puma helicopter pilots and flight engineers who were involved in the rescue operation to airlift passengers and crew from the listing and sinking ship MTS Oceanos, on the Transkei Wild Coast on 4 August 1991.

== Order of wear ==
The position of the Air Force Cross in the official order of precedence was revised three times, to accommodate the institution or addition of new decorations and medals, first upon the integration into the South African National Defence Force on 27 April 1994, again when decorations and medals were belatedly instituted in April 1996 for the two former non-statutory forces, the Azanian People's Liberation Army and Umkhonto we Sizwe, and again when a new series of military decorations and medals was instituted in South Africa on 27 April 2003, but it remained unchanged on all three occasions.

Official SANDF order of precedence

- Preceded by the Army Cross (CM).
- Succeeded by the Navy Cross (CN).

Official national order of precedence

- Preceded by the Army Cross (CM).
- Succeeded by the Navy Cross (CN).

== Description ==
Obverse

The Air Force Cross is a pointed cross, struck in silver, to fit in a circle 45 millimetres in diameter, with the South African Air Force emblem in the centre on a light blue roundel, 18 millimetres in diameter.

Reverse

The reverse has the pre-1994 South African Coat of Arms, with the decoration number impressed underneath.

Air Force Cross and Bar

Bar

The bar was struck in silver and has a Protea emblem embossed in the centre. The same bar was used to indicate multiple awards of the Pro Virtute Medal, Army Cross, Air Force Cross, Navy Cross, Medical Service Cross, Southern Cross Medal (1975) and Pro Merito Medal (1975).

Ribbon

The ribbon is 32 millimetres wide and white, with a 12 millimetres wide centre band consisting of a 5 millimetres wide light blue band, a 2 millimetres wide yellow band and a 5 millimetres wide light blue band.

== Discontinuation ==
Conferment of the decoration was discontinued in respect of services performed on or after 27 April 2003.

== Recipients ==
Since inclusion in the table itself is impractical, the actions cited for follow below the table. The list of recipients is not complete.

CA no.	Name	Rank	Unit	Date of action
	Elphick, Eric Brennan (Note: MTS Oceanos, 4 August 1991 – Awarded to Puma pilots, co-pilots and flight engineers who executed the rescue operation to airlift passengers and crew from the listing and sinking ship MTS Oceanos and from the sea, with no lives lost. Six Puma helicopters had been on standby, equipped with hoisting apparatus, and were tasked for the operation, two each from AFB Durban, AFB Swartkop in Pretoria and AFB Ysterplaat in Cape Town. Three more Puma crews decided to take part of their own accord, even though their helicopters were not configured for hoisting. Without the participation of all nine crews, the rescue operation may well have been less than 100% successful.)	Cmdt	15 Sqn	4 Aug 1991
	Hunter, Anthony Charles	Cmdt		4 Aug 1991
	Fenwick, Phillip	Maj		4 Aug 1991
	Johnson, Anthony Wright	Maj		4 Aug 1991
	Louw, Martin Johannes Hugo	Maj		4 Aug 1991
	Steyn, Hermanus Frederik	Maj		4 Aug 1991
	Stroebel, André	Maj		4 Aug 1991
	Botha, Anton	Capt	19 Sqn	4 Aug 1991
	Coulon, René Martin	Capt		4 Aug 1991
	Goatly, Charles Glen	Capt		4 Aug 1991
	Hanes, Peter Evans	Capt		4 Aug 1991
	Hugo, Jacques	Capt	19 Sqn	4 Aug 1991
	Jooste, Tarri	Capt	19 Sqn	4 Aug 1991
	Meintjies, Hendrik Johannes	Capt		4 Aug 1991
	Pienaar, Len	Capt	19 Sqn	4 Aug 1991
	Thomas, Slade Christoper	Capt		4 Aug 1991
	Weyers, Francois Johann	Capt		4 Aug 1991
	Fairley, Mark Craig	Lt		4 Aug 1991
	Riley, William James	WO2	15 Sqn	4 Aug 1991
	Askew-Hull, Norman Herbert	F Sgt	15 Sqn	4 Aug 1991
	Bezuidenhout, Daniël Francois	F Sgt		4 Aug 1991
	Campher, Frans	F Sgt	19 Sqn	4 Aug 1991
	Jacobs, Daniël Roedolf	F Sgt		4 Aug 1991
	Pedlar, Christoffel Jacobus	F Sgt		4 Aug 1991
	Schutte, Frans	F Sgt	19 Sqn	4 Aug 1991
	Scott, Philip Davey Joseph	F Sgt		4 Aug 1991
	Steyn, Willem Hendrik	F Sgt		4 Aug 1991
83	Van Der Merwe, Eugene	WOII		1995
Bar	Van Der Merwe, Eugene	WOII		2000
