= Navy Cross (South Africa) =

- Type: Military decoration for bravery
- Awarded for: Exceptional courage, leadership, or skill in dangerous or critical situations
- Country: South Africa
- Presented by: the State President and, from 1994, the President
- Eligibility: South African Navy members
- Post-nominals: CN
- Status: Discontinued in 2003
- Established: 1987
- First award: 1991
- Ribbon bar

SADF pre-1994 & SANDF post-2002 orders of wear
- Next (higher): SADF precedence: Air Force Cross; SANDF precedence: Air Force Cross
- Next (lower): SADF succession: Medical Service Cross; SANDF succession: Medical Service Cross

The Navy Cross (Vlootkruis in Afrikaans), post-nominal letters CN (Crux Navalis) is a military decoration which was instituted by the Republic of South Africa in 1987. It was awarded to members of the South African Navy for bravery. It was discontinued in 2003, but backdated awards can still be made for acts of bravery during this period.

The first award was made by the then Chief of the Navy Vice Admiral Robert Simpson-Anderson on 15 August 1994.

== The South African military ==
The Union Defence Forces (UDF) were established in 1912 and renamed the South African Defence Force (SADF) in 1958. On 27 April 1994, it was integrated with six other independent forces into the South African National Defence Force (SANDF).

== Institution ==
The Navy Cross, post-nominal letters CN (Crux Navalis), was instituted by the State President in 1987.

== Award criteria ==
The cross was initially awarded for exceptional ingenuity, resourcefulness and skill, and extraordinary leadership, dedication, sense of duty and personal example and courage in mortal danger in non-combatant situations. After 1993 it was awarded for exceptional courage, leadership, skill, ingenuity or tenacity in dangerous or critical situations. A Bar, instituted in 1993, could be awarded in recognition of further similar displays of courage, leadership, skill, ingenuity or tenacity in danger.

== Order of wear ==
The position of the Navy Cross in the official order of precedence was revised three times, to accommodate the inclusion or institution of new decorations and medals, first upon the integration into the South African National Defence Force on 27 April 1994, again when decorations and medals were belatedly instituted in April 1996 for the two former non-statutory forces, the Azanian People's Liberation Army and Umkhonto we Sizwe, and again when a new series of military decorations and medals was instituted in South Africa on 27 April 2003, but it remained unchanged on all three occasions.

Official SANDF order of precedence

- Preceded by the Air Force Cross (CA) of the Republic of South Africa.
- Succeeded by the Medical Service Cross (CC) of the Republic of South Africa.

Official national order of precedence

- Preceded by the Air Force Cross (CA) of the Republic of South Africa.
- Succeeded by the Medical Service Cross (CC) of the Republic of South Africa.

== Description ==
Obverse

The Navy Cross is a pointed cross, struck in silver, to fit in a circle 45 millimetres in diameter, with the South African Navy emblem in the centre on a navy blue roundel, 18 millimetres in diameter.

Reverse

The reverse has the pre-1994 South African Coat of Arms, with the decoration number impressed underneath.

Navy Cross and Bar

Bar

The Bar was struck in silver and has a Protea emblem embossed in the centre. The same Bar was used to indicate multiple awards of the Pro Virtute Medal, Army Cross, Air Force Cross, Navy Cross, Medical Service Cross, Southern Cross Medal (1975) and Pro Merito Medal (1975).

Ribbon

The ribbon is 32 millimetres wide and white, with a 12 millimetres wide Navy blue centre band.

== Discontinuation ==
Conferment of the decoration was discontinued in respect of services performed on or after 27 April 2003.

== Recipients ==
Since inclusion in the table itself is impractical, the actions cited for follow below the table. The Ranks reflected are the final rank held by the recipient.

CN no.	Name	Rank	Unit	Date awarded
	Barnard, LJ	WO2		22 Apr 1994
	Doult, A	LS		22 Apr 1994
	Minnaar, S (Note: Minnaar, S. – Rescued two Reconnaissance Commando members in full kit, who fell overboard from their rubberduck when it capsized in 3 metre swells during a night exercise.)	LT CDR		18 Jun 1996
	Wooding, L	S LT		18 Jun 1996
	Tancrel, CD	WO1		18 Jun 1996
	Norman, DJH	CDR		20 Sep 2000
	Motsoenyane, F	PO		20 Sep 2000
	Swart, WP	LS		20 Sep 2000
	Palmer, JR	LT CDR		29 Sep 2000
	Stephenson, JD	WO2		29 Sep 2000
	Hicks, NM	CPO		29 Sep 2000
	Jacobs, PL	CPO		29 Sep 2000
	Marnitz, RB	CPO		29 Sep 2000
	Nel, MFJ	CPO		29 Sep 2000
	Zarry, WS	CPO		29 Sep 2000
	Buys, AC	LS		29 Sep 2000
	Ferguson, SC	LS		29 Sep 2000
	Price, L	LS		29 Sep 2000
	Henderson, RW	Cdr	OC Diving School	26 Oct 2001
	Uys, JCI	S LT		26 Oct 2001
	Engelbrecht, JH	WO1		26 Oct 2001
	Smith, NC	CPO	Diving School	26 Oct 2001
	Schoultz, CF	LS		31 Dec 2001
	Van wyk, H	LS		31 Dec 2001
0013	Schoeman, MF (Note: Schoeman, M. – Rescued a Zambian general, who fell overboard off the Navy's strike craft, SAS Galeshewe, at Seal Island near Cape Point in 2001. Lieutenant Schoeman, without hesitation, removed his shoes, jumped into the water and helped save the general who had knocked his head against the bulk of the ship and lost consciousness when he fell overboard.)	LT CDR	SAS Galeshewe	12 Jun 2003
	Stander, A	WO1		13 Apr 2004
	Prinsloo, A	WO2		13 Apr 2004
	Jaffar, MN	CPO		11 Aug 2004
	Pronk, TP	CPO		8 Jul 2006
	Mahlwele, MD	PO		8 Jul 2006
	Hughes, RP	WO2		16 Feb 2007
	Combrink, WW (Note: Combrink, W. – Negotiated with an armed murderer, who had shot and killed two of his men, to hand himself over to Police.)	Cdr		27 Dec 2007
	Lewis, GSM (Note: Lewis, G.S. – Navigated a launch 40 kilometres to safety through rough seas in stormy weather.)	WO2	SAS Protea	27 Dec 2007
-	Frieslaar, J.M (Note: Frieslaar and Williams – For exceptional duties performed during the fires of 2000.)	CPO		27 Dec 2007
	Williams, DC	CPO		27 Dec 2007
