= Southern Cross Medal (1975) =

South African military meritorious service award

- Type: Military decoration for merit
- Awarded for: Exceptionally meritorious service and particular devotion to duty
- Country: South Africa
- Presented by: the State President and, from 1994, the President
- Eligibility: Officers
- Post-nominals: SM
- Status: Discontinued in 2003
- Established: 1975
- First award: 1976
- 1975 and 1986 ribbon bars

SADF pre-1994 & SANDF post-2002 orders of wear
- Next (higher): SADF precedence: Pro Merito Medal (1967); SANDF precedence: Distinguished Service Medal, Silver
- Next (lower): SADF succession: Pro Merito Medal (1975); SANDF succession: Pro Merito Medal (1975)

The Southern Cross Medal of 1975, post-nominal letters SM, is a military decoration which was instituted by the Republic of South Africa on 1 July 1975. It was awarded to officers of the South African Defence Force for exceptionally meritorious service and particular devotion to duty. It represents the highest Presidential Medal that can be bestowed upon a member of the military in South Africa.

== The South African military ==
The Union Defence Forces (UDF) were established in 1912 and renamed the South African Defence Force (SADF) in 1958. On 27 April 1994, it was integrated with six other independent forces into the South African National Defence Force (SANDF).

== Institution ==
The Southern Cross Medal of 1975, post-nominal letters SM, was instituted by the State President on 1 July 1975 and replaced the Southern Cross Medal of 1952.

== Award criteria ==
It was awarded to officers of the South African Defence Force for exceptionally meritorious service and particular devotion to duty. The use of post-nominal letters by all recipients was allowed from 1993. A bar, instituted in 1993 as well, could be awarded in recognition of further similar displays of meritorious service and devotion to duty.

While not prescribed, the practice was generally that recipients must already have received the Military Merit Medal. The equivalent award for other ranks was the Pro Merito Medal of 1975.

Although a rare occurrence, some officers were awarded both versions of the Southern Cross Medal, one such example being Vice-Admiral Lambert Jackson Woodburne DVR, SD, SM, former Chief of the Navy. In such cases, the post-nominal letters "SM" are used once only.

== Order of wear ==
The position of the Southern Cross Medal of 1975 in the official order of precedence was revised three times after 1975, to accommodate the inclusion or institution of new decorations and medals, first upon the integration into the South African National Defence Force on 27 April 1994, again when decorations and medals were belatedly instituted in April 1996 for the two former non-statutory forces, the Azanian People's Liberation Army and Umkhonto we Sizwe, and again when a new series of military orders, decorations and medals was instituted in South Africa on 27 April 2003. Its position remained unchanged, as it was on 27 April 1994, upon the latter two occasions.

South African Defence Force until 26 April 1994

- Official SADF order of precedence:
  - Preceded by the Pro Merito Medal (1967) (PMM).
  - Succeeded by the Pro Merito Medal (1975) (PMM).
- Official national order of precedence:
  - Preceded by the Medal for Merit in the South African Prisons Service.
  - Succeeded by the Pro Merito Medal (1975) (PMM).

South African National Defence Force from 27 April 1994

- Official SANDF order of precedence:
  - Preceded by the Distinguished Service Medal, Silver of the Republic of Venda.
  - Succeeded by the Pro Merito Medal (1975) (PMM) of the Republic of South Africa.
- Official national order of precedence:
  - Preceded by the Medal for Merit in the Prisons Service of the Republic of South Africa.
  - Succeeded by the Pro Merito Medal (1975) (PMM) of the Republic of South Africa.

== Description ==
Obverse

The Southern Cross Medal of 1975 is struck in silver, to fit in a circle 38 millimetres in diameter, and is 3 millimetres thick at the centre. It depicts the stars of the Southern Cross against a dark blue enameled background, on a framed roundel in the centre of a starburst of radiating points.

Reverse

The reverse has the pre-1994 South African Coat of Arms, with the decoration number impressed underneath.

Southern Cross Medal and Bar

Bar

The bar was struck in silver and has a Protea emblem embossed in the centre. The same bar was used to indicate multiple awards of the Pro Virtute Medal, Army Cross, Air Force Cross, Navy Cross, Medical Service Cross, Southern Cross Medal (1975) and Pro Merito Medal (1975).

Ribbons

The original ribbon was 32 millimetres wide, with a 2 millimetres wide white band, an 11½ millimetres wide dark blue band and a 1 millimetre wide white band, repeated in reverse order and separated by a 3 millimetres wide white band in the centre.

It was replaced by a new ribbon in 1986, 32 millimetres wide with a 4½ millimetres wide white band, a 9 millimetres wide dark blue band and a 1 millimetre wide white band, repeated in reverse order and separated by a 3 millimetres wide dark blue band in the centre.

== Discontinuation ==
Conferment of the decoration was discontinued in respect of services performed on or after 27 April 2003, when the Southern Cross Medal was replaced by the iPhrothiya yeSiliva (PS).
