= 6 Medical Battalion Group =

6 Medical Battalion Group (6 Med Bn Gp)
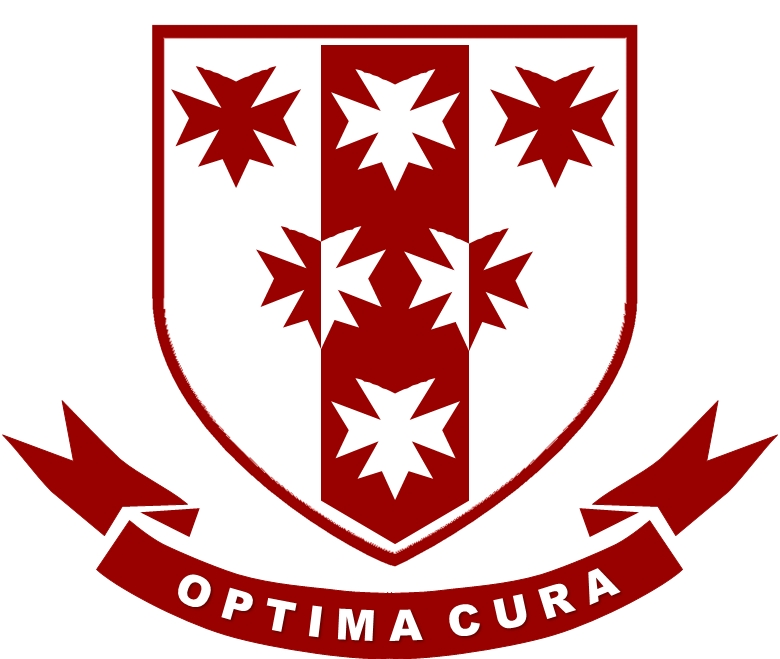
- Active: 1903 – Present
- Country: South Africa
- Allegiance: Republic of South Africa
- Branch: South African Military Health Service
- Type: Reserve Force
- Size: 400+
- Part of: South African Department of Defence; SAMHS Conventional Reserve
- Nickname: 6 Med
- Motto: Optima Cura – Excellence in Care
- Engagements: Boer War; World War I World War II; Border War
- Website: Website currently not available

Commanders
- Current commander: Colonel M.I. Mogari

Insignia
NATO Symbol
6

6 Medical Battalion Group (6 Med Bn Gp or 6 Med) is a Medical Battalion in the South African Military Health Service (SAMHS). SAMHS is the fourth Arm of Service of the South African National Defence Force (SANDF).

The unit forms part of the Mobile Military Health Formation of the SAMHS with the mandate to deliver comprehensive Military Medical Health Services to the SANDF during conventional operations, by combat-ready reserve force members, in a military as well as a civilian capacity.

As a reserve unit, 6 Med Bn Gp has a status roughly equivalent to that of a British Army Reserve or United States Army National Guard unit. It is presently based in Kempton Park in Gauteng, South Africa.

== Background ==
=== Development of the Volunteer Medical Service in the Transvaal ===
Prior and during the Second Boer War (1889 – 1902), there was no organised military medical units within South Africa. Hospitals were established however, and medical duties were performed by personnel from European countries.

==== Transvaal Medical Volunteer Staff Corps ====
After the hostilities, it was decided to form a new Transvaal Medical Volunteer Staff Corps, under the leadership of Lt Col D.W. Johnston of Johannesburg.

Prior to 1903, the only Military Medical unit on the Witwatersrand was a medical section of the Rand Rifles, and it is probable that the Transvaal Medical Volunteer Staff Corps arose out of this medical section. The Unit was formally established on 20 March 1903, consisting of 4 companies and totaled 400 men.

A further expansion of the Transvaal Medical Volunteer Staff Corps to 5 companies, and the establishment of a Nursing Sister's Reserve (consisting of one Matron and 20 Nursing Sisters) took place in 1904. These nurses undertook to make themselves available in war and emergency situations to care for the wounded.

Members were armed for their own protection and that of their patients. As a result, rifle drills and drill movements similar to those practised by the infantry received a lot of attention.

The first Sisters to be appointed were Miss M.N. Carston and Miss E.M. Devenish.

==== Transvaal Medical Corps ====
In 1907, a mounted section and a cyclist section was authorised and the total strength reduced to 300 men. On 1 July 1907, the unit changed its name to the Transvaal Medical Corps (TMC).

==== 1st Field Ambulance (Transvaal), South African Medical Corps (SAMC) ====
In 1908, a Matron, Miss Margaret Patterson, was appointed. The volunteer organisation continued until 1912 when the Union Defence Act came into force, and a Medical Citizen Force was officially recognised and established by publication in the Government Gazette on 9 October 1913, with the Transvaal Medical Corp being disbanded and the new unit being named after embodiment as 1st Field Ambulance (Transvaal) South African Medical Corps (SAMC).

It became "Die eerste Veldambulans van die Zuid Afrikaanse Geneeskundige Dienste" (The first Field Ambulance of the Zuid Afrikaanse Medical Services).

In June 1913, 1 Field Ambulance (Tvl) was mobilised to assist with the Civil Disturbances and rendered first aid from the Drill Hall in Johannesburg. In 1914 it was mobilised again for Civil Disturbances and established a 50-bed hospital in the Wanderers Club building in Johannesburg. The 1 Field Ambulance SAMC (Tvl) (not to be confused with 1 SA Field Ambulance) was under command of Major J. Pratt-Jones, served in the First Great War and took part in the German South-West Africa Campaign, with the forces that operated from Luderitz under Gen Sir Duncan MacKenzie.

In 1926, the Government awarded Campaign Honours "The Great War - SW Africa 1914–1915 to 1 Field Ambulance SAMC (Tvl).

This unit served in

- the 1906 Natal Zulu strikes,
- the Johannesburg strikes,
- South West Africa,
- East Africa,
- Madagascar, and
- Italy.

==== 10 Field Ambulance (Transvaal), South African Medical Corps (SAMC) ====
During World War II, 10 Field Ambulance Unit was established in 1940. This unit served in North Africa during the war in Egypt.

==== 11 Field Ambulance (Transvaal), South African Medical Corps (SAMC) ====
Afterwards, 11 Field Ambulance was established and served at El Alamein. This unit was dismantled in 1945 and grouped into two battalions.

=== Fourth Arm of Service created in 1979 ===
Subsequently, on 1 July 1979, the South African Medical Corps (SAMC), until that time a Corps of the Army, became the South African Medical Service (SAMS), the fourth arm of the South African Defence Force (SADF), and it was renamed the South African Military Health Service (SAMHS) in 1994 when the South African National Defence Force (SANDF) was constituted.

== History ==
The Medical Battalion Group (Med Bn Gp) was created in the 1980s to replace a combination of mobile hospitals, field ambulance units and assorted other medical units.

8 Mobile Hospital was disbanded on 5 November 1981, when the majority of the serving and active members were incorporated into 6 Medical Battalion Group at the time.

Subsequently, all existing Medical Battalion Groups were re-constituted and re-formed to create only five Medical Battalion Groups in 1992,

three Battalion Groups were staffed by the Reserve Force, namely

- 1 Medical Battalion Group (1 Med Bn Gp), based in Durban
- 3 Medical Battalion Group (3 Med Bn Gp), based in Cape Town
- 6 Medical Battalion Group (6 Med Bn Gp), based in Pretoria initially, and later in Johannesburg,

and two Battalion Groups were staffed by the Regular Force, namely

- 7 Medical Battalion Group (7 Med Bn Gp), based in Centurion
- 8 Medical Battalion Group (8 Med Bn Gp)

As such, 6 Medical Battalion Group was re- established on 1 September 1992, with the consolidation of

- 2 Med Bn Gp,
- 5 Med Bn Gp, and
- 6 Med Bn Gp

Thus creating one of the three existing Medical Battalion Groups within the Reserve Force of the SAMS, and later, the SAMHS.

=== 2 Medical Battalion Group ===
2 Medical Battalion Group can trace its roots back to the amalgamation of the following units in 1981:

- 13 Field Ambulance – established during 1954(?)
- 6 Mobile Hospital – established on 1 April 1965 (also known as 9 Field Military Hospital)
- 7 Mobile Hospital
- 10 Field Ambulance

=== 5 Medical Battalion Group ===
5 Medical Battalion Group can trace its roots back to the amalgamation of the following units in 1981:

- 5 Field Ambulance – dating back to 1903
- 19 Field Ambulance Unit – established on 1 July 1940 (serving in Italy during WW II in the 6th Armoured Division from 21 April 1944 to 2 May 1945.

=== 6 Medical Battalion Group ===
6 Medical Battalion Group can trace its roots to the demobilisation of the following units on 5 November 1981, and subsequent formation of the Battalion Group on the same date:

- 18 Field Ambulance – established in 1940 (Also served at El Alamein)
- 9 Field Ambulance Unit – established on 22 August 1961
- 25 Field Health Company – established in 1965
- Medical Conveyance Unit (Despatch) – established in 1971
- 8 Mobile Hospital – established in 1972 (This unit provided the largest contingent of volunteer members to 6 Med Bn Gp during the formation of the battalion on 1 May 1982)
- 81 Field Ambulance Unit – established in 1975

== Headquarters ==
6 Medical Battalion Group has had various headquarters since establishment on 1 September 1992:

- The disused nurse's kitchen at the old 1 Military Hospital in Voortrekkerhoogte until 1993
- Joint Headquarters with Witwatersrand Medical Command in Braamfontein until 1994
- Joint Headquarters with 7 SA Division in Kensington until 1999
- Joint Headquarters with Gauteng Medical Command in Rietondale until 2008
- Battalion Headquarters in Kempton Park until present

== Structure ==
6 Medical Battalion group is structured on the standard medical battalion as envisaged by the SAMHS for operational support to landward Army groups. It consists of

- a Command Element,
- two Operational Wings,
- a Clinical Wing,
- a Specialised Medical Support Wing,
- a Force Support Wing (including logistics and human resources), and
- a Force Preparation Wing (including training and development).

The command structure of the battalion group is composed of

- an Officer Commanding,
- a Regimental Sergeant Major,
- a Chaplain,
- a Chief of Staff, and
- an Adjutant.

Wing Commanders and their Wing Warrant Officers join the command structure to form the Command Group, which jointly manages the affairs of the Battalion under the leadership of the Officer Commanding.

The operational make-up of the battalion includes most of the medical disciplines associated with rendering 1st and 2nd line medical support, with statutory appointments such as Medical Officers, Nursing Officers, Dental Officers and the Operational Medical Orderly.

The following Officers were appointed as Officers Commanding (OC) of 6 Medical Battalion Group, and the following Warrant Officers as Regimental Sergeant Major (RSM) since establishment on 1 September 1992:

=== Command ===
From	Officers Commanding	To	Ribbon
1982	Cmdt (Dr.) F.W. te Groen	1992	
1992	Col (Dr. Prof.) P.F. Coetzee MMM	2005	Military Merit Medal MMM
2005	Col (Dr.) A.N.C. Maminze	2012	
2012	Col (Dr.) A. Ledwaba †	2014	
2014	Col (Dr.) M.I. Mogari	Present	
From	Regimental Sergeants Major	To	Ribbon
1982	unknown	1992	
1992	WO1 Neels Cornelius MMM	2005	Military Merit Medal MMM
2005	WO1 F.A.P. van Deventer *	2012	
2013	WO1 C.H. Rootman *	2015	
2015	unknown *	2017	
2017	vacant	2019	
2019	WO1 C.H. Rootman *	Present	

Note (1): Although it is not a specific requirement, all of the Officers Commanding to date have been qualified medical doctors.

Note (2): The first Regimental Sergeant Major (RSM) of the amalgamated 6 Med Bn Gp was WO1 Neels "Cor" Cornelius (18 July 1959 - 13 October 2020), who served as RSM from 1 September 1992 through 31 March 2005.

Note (3): All* the Regimental Sergeants Major (RSM) since RSM Cornelius in 2005 have been acting RSM.

=== Honorary Colonel ===
On 4 July 2008, the then Executive Mayor of Tshwane, Dr Gwendoline M. Ramokgopa was inaugurated as the first Honorary Colonel of 6 Medical Battalion Group at the Tshwane City Hall following a parade through the streets of Pretoria.

=== Proficiency Insignia ===
Proficiency insignia of the South African Military Health Service (SAMHS)
Medical Doctor	Nurse	Dentist	Health Inspector	Veterinarian	Farrier	Administrative	Pharmacist	Psychologist	Social Work Officer	Ancillary Health	Ops Medic

== Operations and deployments ==
=== Operations ===
Deployed three Medical Task Teams during Operation JAMBU over the (first democratic election) period 15 April to 15 May 1994. These three Medical Task teams were all charged with the medical support to the SA Army and its support elements.

- Medical Task Team Alpha deployed to Group 18 (at Doornkop; in support of Johannesburg and Midrand),
- Medical Task Team Bravo deployed to Group 41 (at Thokoza; in support of the greater East Rand), and
- Medical Task Team Charlie deployed to Group 42 (based at Lenz; in support of the Greater Soweto and West Rand).

Tactical Medical Support provided by deployment of Operational Emergency care Practitioners to Civil Emergency and Ambulance Services in the Greater Johannesburg area from 1995 to 1998.

=== Deployment exercises ===
- Participated in Exercise EXCALIBUR IV at the Army Battle School (Lohatla) over the period 2 to 20 October 1992.
- Participated in Exercise VULCAN in the Eastern Transvaal over the period 1 to 13 August 1993.
- Participated in Exercise VINCITI I at the Army Battle School (Lohatla) over the period 27 July to 20 August 1994.

== Equipment ==
=== Weaponry ===
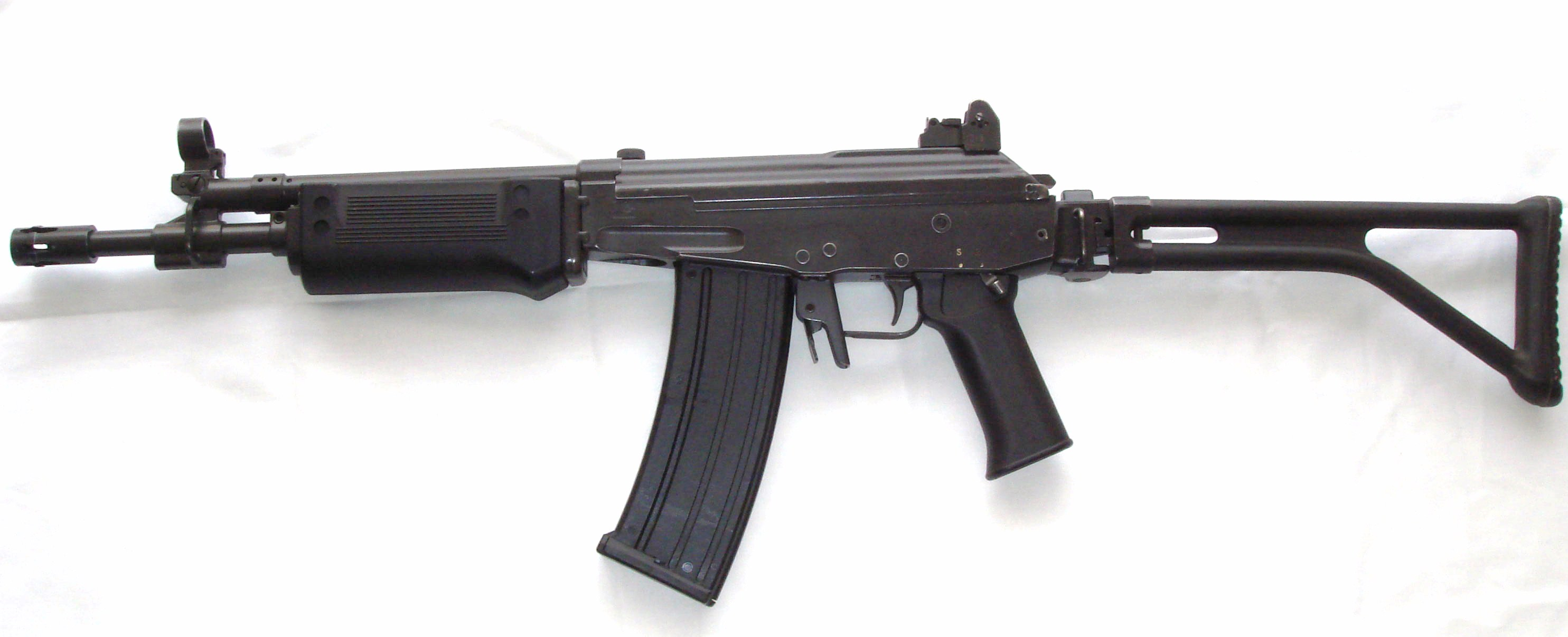
R5 assault rifle

The main personal weapon of operationally deployed members of the battalion is the R5 assault rifle, whilst Warrant Officers and Officers are usually issued with a 9mm pistol as a personal sidearm.

SA Military Health Service members are not included in the fighting arm of a military force, but are issued weapons for personal protection and the protection of their patients, in line with Article 15 of the Geneva Convention of 1949.

=== Vehicles ===
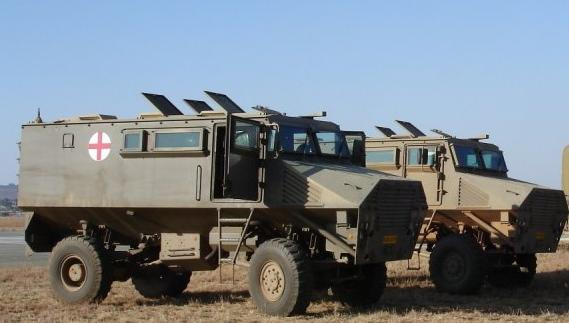
Mfezi armoured ambulance

The Mfezi Ambulance is the workhorse of all Operational Medics and the battalion makes use of the 17 ton armoured ambulance during operations. The Mfezi is operated by two medical orderlies and has the capacity to hold four patients lying down and four sitting. The configuration of the inside of the vehicle can be changed as needed according to the situation, although this requires a workshop intervention.

The name Mfezi is a Zulu word that means cobra. The snake is the emblem of the South African Operational Medical Orderly who operate and use these vehicles, therefore armoured ambulances are named for snakes in South African military service.

== See also ==
- NATO Military Symbols for Land Based Systems
- Operational Medical Orderly
- South African military ranks
- Military history of South Africa
