= Battle honours of South Africa =

South Africa follows the British system of awarding battle honours to military units, to recognise the battles, theatres and campaigns in which they have fought with distinction.

== History ==
Before the unification of Union of South Africa in 1910, units were largely left to invent their own battle honours. Exceptions were the honours for the Anglo-Zulu War (1879) and the Natal Rebellion (1906), which were authorised by the Natal colonial government in 1909 and 1908 respectively, and the honours for the Anglo-Boer War (1899–1902), which were authorised by the British authorities.

Many of these units were embodied in the Union Defence Force in 1913. The UDF did not acknowledge their self-assumed battle honours in official publications, e.g. the annual Officers List, but did not prevent the units from displaying the honours on their Colours. Only in the 1960s were these honours reviewed: many were then approved, but some were disallowed.

Battle honours for World War I (1914–18) were authorised for the UDF and South African Overseas Expeditionary Force units in 1926 and 1927. By then, the SAOEF units had all been disbanded, so they were unable to display them.

In 1937–38, the UDF authorised commando units to bear battle honours for campaigns and operations in which their 19th-century predecessors had fought. As many were later found to be inaccurate, the defence force ruled in 1971 that commandos were no longer to display them.

Battle honours for World War II (1939–45) were authorised for the army, air force, and navy in 1957. Honours for the Korean War (1950–53) were authorised at the same time.

Honours for the Border War (1966–89) and the 1975–76 and 1987–88 Angola campaigns were announced in 1993, but in view of the political transition that followed soon afterwards, it is unclear how many units actually received these honours.

== Customs of the services ==
=== SA Army ===
In the army, battle honours are granted to mounted, infantry and armoured regiments, which display them on their Regimental Colours. Traditionally, the artillery are not granted honours, but an exception was made for them for World War I. Some infantry regiments which were converted to artillery after World War II were not allowed to display their honours, or to receive World War II honours, until after they had been converted back to infantry (or armour) in the 1960s.

The battle honours of a regiment which has been disbanded become dormant until such time – if ever – as it is re-formed, or another regiment is officially recognised as its successor. An example is the South African Cape Corps, formed in 1973, which was allowed the honours won by the 1st Battalion, Cape Corps in World War I.

The honours of a regiment which is divided into two or more battalions are transferred to the new battalions, which can thereafter earn their own individual honours. In this way, Regiment Vrystaat, formed in 1975 as a second battalion of Regiment President Steyn, and later a regiment in its own right, bears the battle honours which RPS won in World War II. Conversely, if a multi-battalion regiment is later reduced to a single battalion, the honours of all the former battalions are combined and transferred to the surviving unit.

=== SA Air Force ===
In the air force, battle honours are granted only to flying squadrons, which display them on their Squadron Colours. If a squadron is disbanded, its honours become dormant, but if it is re-formed (i.e. a new squadron is given the same number as the disbanded unit), the honours are revived and granted to the successor squadron.

=== SA Navy ===
In the navy, battle honours are granted only to seagoing vessels, which display them on plaques. The honours are linked to the ships' names, so that if a ship is taken out of commission, and a later ship is given the same name, she inherits the honours earned by her predecessor(s). As none of the World War II ship names are currently in use, the navy's battle honours are effectively dormant.

=== SA Military Health Service ===
Medical units do not usually receive battle honours, but an exception was made for them in World War I. On 20 February 2014 7 Medical Battalion Group was awarded battle honours to be displayed on the unit colours for the first time for its participation in the Battle of Bangui in the Central African Republic during March 2013.

=== SA Police ===
The former South African Police (1913–95) had a strong military tradition, which included fielding active service contingents in World Wars I and II, and conducting counter-insurgency operations in southern Africa in the 1960s and 1970s. Police units earned several battle honours, which were displayed on the Colour of the police force from 1971 until 1994. As the SAP as such no longer exists, its honours are presumably now dormant.

== See also ==
List of South African Battle Honours

== Bibliography ==
- Curson, H.H. (1948). Honours and Colours in South Africa.
- Digby, Peter K.A. (August 1993). Poppies and Pyramids:The 1st SA Infantry Brigade in Libya, France and Flanders, 1915-1919 (illustrated ed.). Ashanti Publishing. ISBN 978-1874800538.
- Smith, H.H. (1998). South African Military Colours 1664–1994. Vol. Part I.
- Smith, H.H. (1999). South African Military Colours 1912–1994. Vol. Part II Vol 1.
- Smith, H.H. (2005). South African Military Colours 1912–1994. Vol. Part II Vol 2.
