= 7 Medical Battalion Group =

- Country: South Africa
- Allegiance: Republic of South Africa
- Branch: South African Military Health Service
- Type: Special Forces
- Role: Airborne Search and Rescue, Medical Evacuation, Chemical and Biological Warfare, Emergency Medicine, Diving Medicine, Aviation Medicine, Close Protection
- Garrison/HQ: Lyttelton, Centurion
- Mottos: "Audacissimos Servamus"; Serving the bravest "God above all" (unofficial)

Commanders
- Current commander: Col (Dr) Qaba Solomon Morena Mafa
- Notable commanders: Cmdt (Dr) Wouter Basson, Col (Dr) Chris J Blunden, Col William Mutlow, Maj Gen (Dr) Mcebisi Zukile Mdutywa, Brig Gen (Dr) Sithembiso Paul Chiliza

7 Medical Battalion Group is the specialist Airborne Medical Unit of the South African Military Health Service. The Battalion's main task is to render medical support to the South African Airborne and Special Forces. The unit falls under the command of the Mobile Military Health Formation.

Other specialties of the Battalion include Combat Search and Rescue, CBRNE detection, verification and decontamination, Diving and Aviation medicine and numerous other skills associated in supporting Special Forces.

Little is publicly known of this elite medical unit primarily because of its association with the South African Special Forces. The unit's founder Commandant Wouter Basson led the research on the SADF Chemical and Biological Warfare program.

Other tasks of the battalion include, but are not limited to, medical support to the South African Police Service Special Task Force and other elite units, the South African Air Force Combat Search and Rescue units and the Presidential Protection Services (particularly in the context of Joint VVIP Protection Operations).

The unit is on a general six-hour standby and is ready to deploy nationally and internationally. It also maintains a limited Chemical, Biological, Radiological and Nuclear defence capability.

== History ==
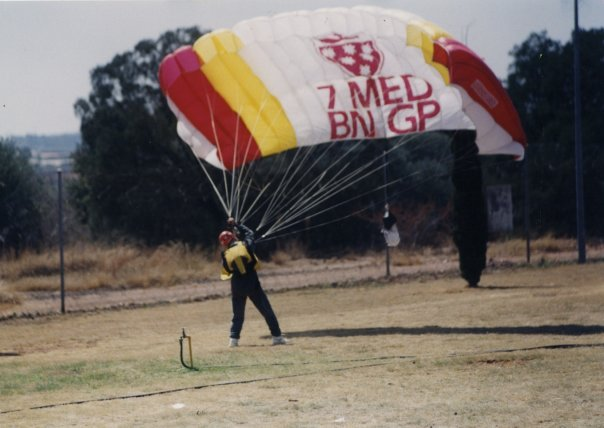
7 Med Operator lands after freefall demonstration jump

In the early 1980s the South African Reconnaissance Commandos (now the South African Special Forces Brigade) identified the need for a special medical unit to support Special Forces on operations and the Detachment Medical Special Operations was formed. Under command of the Surgeon General, a group of 9 doctors with Commandant Wouter Basson at the head, founded what would later become the 7 Medical Battalion Group at Special Forces Brigade Headquarters (Speskop) south of Pretoria in 1984. The Battalion officially received its Unit flag and Colours on 14 April 1987 when it was named 7 Medical Battalion Group and incorporated into the South African Medical Service (now the South African Military Health Service). The year 1987 is considered the unit's birth year although the exact date is unknown.

The first group of doctors and medics completed the full Special Forces training cycle, or were already Special Forces operators.

In its early days unit members were involved in clandestine operations working closely with Special Forces, the Parachute Battalions supporting UNITA and Project Coast.

The need for specially trained medics and doctors to support the Airborne units (Parabats) and the Recces increased as the Angolan Bush War intensified. The unit eventually started its own training as required by the Reconnaissance and Airborne units. The training cycle produced an Operational Medic or Operational Doctor who was fully qualified and equipped to support and deploy with Airborne or Special Forces during operations.

At its inception, 7 Med was housed at the back of SAMS (South African Medical Services) College in Voortrekker Hoogte and the unit used two mobile homes for offices. As the Unit expanded, the need for a bigger facility arose and the Battalion was moved to Lyttelton, Centurion where it currently shares the premises with the Institute For Aviation Medicine (IAM).

The Battalion consists of an HQ wing, Training wing, Quick Reaction wing, Health Professionals wing, Chemical Biological Warfare Defence wing and Medical Task Teams at Special Forces Regiments as well as a Medical Task Group at 44 Parachute Regiment.

On 21 February 2014, the unit received Battle Honours to be displayed on the unit colours for the first time for its participation in the Battle of Bangui Central African Republic March 2013. It is unusual for a medical unit to receive Battle Honours.

== Operations and deployments ==
=== 1980's to 1994 ===
==== Angolan Bush War ====
Very little is known of the involvement of 7 Med Bn Gp's operators during the Bush War. Special Forces operations post 1984 were supported by elements of 7 Med Bn Gp. The Battalion also supported the Parachute Battalions operating in Angola and on the South West Africa (Namibia) Border. 7 Med were involved in almost all major operations during the latter phases of the war. During Operation Modular, Operation Hooper and Operation Packer, 7 Med supported its various units of responsibility wherever they were deployed during the fighting. It is also claimed that 7 Med was involved in a defensive NBCD advisory role during some operations; details are limited.

During the Angolan Bush War a member of 7 Med was killed in action. Corporal Bruce Andrew Fidler, an operational medical support operator of 7 Med Bn Gp with Special Forces training, was killed in action in Angola on 15 September 1985. The details are sketchy but it is understood that Corporal Fidler supported a "clandestine" unit of the SADF most probably 1 Parachute Battalion, tasked to train UNITA in support of the SADF's Operation Magneto . His unit was ambushed and he was subsequently captured. Cpl Fidler was executed by the enemy after brutal interrogation. According to records he never revealed the location of his nearby unit in spite of brutal interrogation at the hands of his captors enabling them (7 Med Bn Gp, medical surgical team) to escape and evade capture. His remains were repatriated to South Africa in June 1992 and cremated precisely 7 years after his death on 15 September 1992. Corporal Fidler was posthumously awarded the Honoris Crux Silver (only 27 were ever awarded) for his actions of bravery. Cpl Fidler's name appears on the roll of honour of both 1 Parachute Battalion and 7 Medical Battalion Group.

It is believed that 7 Medical Battalion Group supported UNITA and RENAMO and that injured members of these organizations were secretly evacuated to South Africa for treatment at 1 Military Hospital in Pretoria.

==== Township violence pre-1994 elections ====
7 Medical Battalion Group supported the Parachute and other units during internal stability operations during the run up to the country's first democratic general elections in 1994.

==== MTS Oceanos rescue mission ====
On 4 August 1991 the MTS Oceanos, a Greek-owned cruise ship, sank off the coast of South Africa 10 km (6.2 mi) South of Coffee Bay. A 7 Medical Battalion Group medical doctor was attached to the rescue effort; all 571 passengers and crew on board were flown by South African Air Force helicopters to shore.

=== 1994 to present ===
==== 1998 Nairobi US embassy bombings ====
On 7 August 1998 a truck bomb outside the US Embassy in Nairobi, Kenya detonated killing 212 people and injuring approximately 4000 people. 7 Med deployed a team to evacuate and treat both US and local personnel working in the embassy. 2 Injured American Citizens were treated on site and later evacuated to South Africa.

==== Operation Boleas ====
Operation Boleas was a Southern African Development Community (SADC) sanctioned military operation led by South Africa to stabilize the country of Lesotho following a coup d'état. The operation came into effect at first light on 22 September 1998. 7 Medical Battalion Group (7 Med) deployed 15 to 20 Ops medics and doctors who were tasked to support almost the whole task force of approximately 700 troops, which included elements of 1 Special Service Battalion, 1 South African Infantry Battalion (Motorised), 1 Parachute Battalion, a pathfinder platoon of 44 Parachute Regiment and a battalion of the Botswana Defense Force.

Two 7 Med members were killed during intense fighting at Katse Dam on 22 September 1998, attached to the pathfinders namely Capt. (doctor) J. Nel and Sgt. J.A. Sax. Capt. Nel was posthumously awarded the Medical Service Cross (CC) in attempting to save Sgt. Sax's life. Sergeant Sax was the first newly formed South African National Defence Force soldier to be killed in action. After Sergeant Sax was seriously wounded Captain (doctor) Johan Nel went to the Sergeant's aid in spite of heavy enemy fire. Shortly afterwards Captain Nel was also hit and killed by enemy fire whilst attempting to treat the Sergeant's injuries. Several members of 7 Med distinguished themselves during the initial incursion into Lesotho.

In many cases 7 Med members were at the forefront of the action. Another member of the unit, Cpl Ewerhard Brits, was awarded the Medical Service Cross (CC) for actions of bravery at Mokanyane Base where 8 members of the Parachute Battalion were killed in action. The battle for Mokanyane base had some of the fiercest fighting in the whole conflict.

The operation lasted for 7 months and with peace and order restored most of the Ops Medics of 7 Med Bn Gp returned to the unit HQ within a month. Their replacements came from the Orange Free State Medical Command.

==== Operation Litchi ====
On 22 February 2000 Cyclone Eline devastated Mozambique with approximately 800 people killed and 45 000 left homeless. 7 Medical Battalion Group was immediately deployed to assist the South African Air Force contingent during rescue and the subsequent humanitarian relief operations. A member of the unit (Cpl Tshifhiwa Godfrey Nengovhela) made world news by performing a difficult rescue of a mother and her new born baby from a tree.

==== Northern Algeria earthquake ====
On 21 May 2003 the 6.8 Mw Boumerdès earthquake shook northern Algeria with a maximum Mercalli intensity of X (Extreme). The shock generated a destructive tsunami in the Mediterranean Sea and left 2,266 dead and 10,261 injured. 7 Med deployed a team to assist the South African contingent both medically and to assist in the actual technical search and rescue efforts.

==== Antarctic support ====
The South African Department of Environmental Affairs maintains bases on Gough, Marion Island as well as Antarctica for environmental research purposes. Each year a research team is sent to each of these bases. Until recently 7 Med Bn Gp supplied Ops Medics for these deployments of up to 15 months. On 22 November 1995, Pierre Venter, a 7 Med Ops medic, died during a whiteout when he was separated from a search party during a storm.

==== United Nations peacekeeping missions ====
In recent years the Battalion supported the South African National Defense Force throughout Africa in its role as a peacekeeping force. Recent deployments include Operation Fibre in Burundi and Operation Mistral in the Democratic Republic of the Congo. Members of 7 Med were also present with the recent deployment of the SANDF as part of the Force Intervention Brigade in 2013/14.

==== Operation Bata 2007 ====
The South African Military Health Service was called upon to run hospitals and other public facilities during a protracted civil service strike in 2007. Several members of 7 Med participated and were awarded the Tshumelo Ikatelaho medal which was collectively awarded to all participants of this operation.

==== Battle of Bangui ====
Elements of 7 Medical Battalion participated in the Battle of Bangui in the Central African Republic. The battle has been described by military analysts as one of the hardest-fought actions by the SA Army. During this battle which lasted from 22 March 2013 – 24 March 2013 a company of about 200 South African paratroops supplemented by a small number of Special Forces members were attacked on the outskirts of Bangui by a rebel force estimated to be 3 000 strong. During this action 13 South African paratroopers were killed and a further 27 wounded. Rebel losses are estimated to have been in excess of 800. For their actions during this battle three 7Med Bn Gp members (Sergeant Mampa Serole Colman, Corporal Ngobese Mandla Maxwell and Corporal Nkoana Molatelo Alphina) were awarded the Nkwe ya Boronse decoration for valour. On 21 February 2014, together with 1 Parachute Battalion and 5 Special Forces Regiment, 7 Medical Battalion Group received battle honours for the first time. 13 Other members of 7 Medical Battalion group received various medals for their participation in the Battle of Bangui.

==== Insurgency in Cabo Delgado ====
Following instability in the Mozambican province of Cabo Delgado the Southern African Development Community agreed that a multinational intervention was necessary. South Africa's contribution to the resultant SADC Mission in Mozambique, SAMIM, was initially composed of forces from the special operations elements of the SANDF (SA Special Forces and 7 Medical Battalion Group).

== Chemical Biological Warfare Wing ==
The Chemical Biological Warfare Wing is responsible for the training of the SANDF, South African Police Service (SAPS) and other government agencies in defensive CBRNE measures. Other functions include the maintenance of a CBRNE detection and verification capability and the conduct of research and development of equipment and techniques in cooperation with local civilian contractors.

CBW wing members are trained to various levels in both defensive military CBRNE as well as civilian HAZMAT response. The system of training enables CBW wing members to easily integrate with civilian emergency services if the need arises.

Prior to and during the 2010 FIFA World Cup 7 Med CBW Wing personnel were used in the procurement and employment of CBRNE detection equipment. Home-grown decontamination equipment and techniques were co-developed with civilian contractors in preparation for the same event. Many of those developments and techniques have since been adopted by other nations.

The 7 Med CBW Wing assist the South African government in its obligations to the Chemical Weapons Convention (CWC). It does so by providing training and assistance to members of signatory states in cooperation with the Organisation for the Prohibition of Chemical Weapons (OPCW). CBW Wing members regularly attend foreign training courses to ensure that knowledge and skills remain at the highest levels.

== Selection and training ==
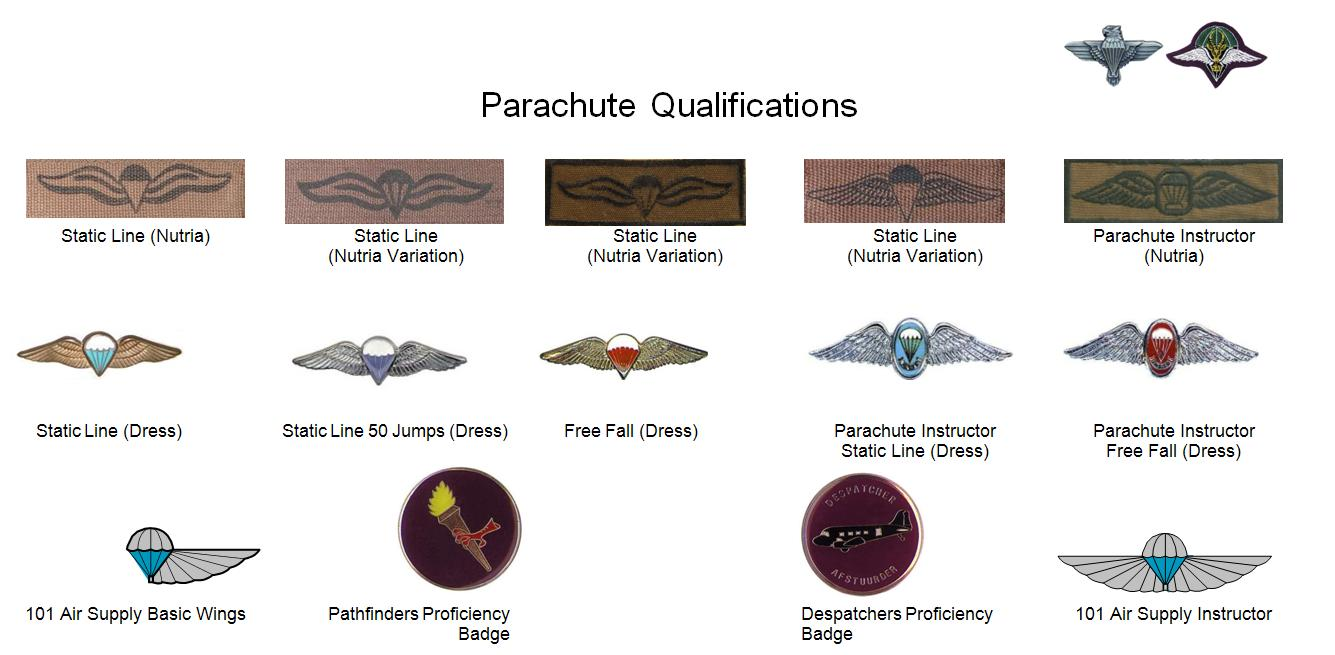
Parachute Qualifications

Candidates must pass a pre-selection consisting of the South African Army fitness test and psychometric assessments before being allowed on the training cycle.

The 7 Medical Battalion Group training cycle takes approximately a year to complete and in itself is the selection of the unit, due to the high course attrition rate. No formal selection is conducted although during the parachute course; a rigorous 3-day selection must be passed in order to be allowed onto the basic Parachute Jump course. The parachute course usually concludes the basic training cycle. On completion, candidates are qualified as Combat Medical Support Operators and awarded the 7 Med Bn Gp Ops badge to be worn on the right chest and the Parachute wings on the left. Only approximately 10% of all candidates who start the training cycle succeed. The 7 Medical Battalion Group Medical Support badge differs from the normal Operational Medical Orderly badge. The staff has been replaced by a Special Forces Commando dagger and indicates the Special Forces connection. Doctors do the whole training cycle with the exception of the medical phase before being awarded the 7 Med Bn Gp Doctor's badge with the Special Forces Commando dagger. Both badges were first issued in 1993. Prior to 1993, 7 Med Operators were only identified by shoulder flashes and parachute wings-insignia. In many cases members of the unit wore the maroon beret of the Reconnaissance regiments and the Paratroopers as well as other insignia like stable belts and shoulder flashes of the units they were attached to. Various qualification badges are worn by members of 7 Med who are allowed to do all airborne courses presented by 44 Parachute Regiment.

The 7 Med Bn Gp Operators badge is also awarded to members of Special Forces after completion of the medical phase presented by 7 Med.

=== Basic training cycle ===
- Level 1-3 Basic Life Support.
- Level 5 Advanced Life Support: During this phase the candidate learns the skills of the Operational Medical Orderly more commonly known as the Ops Medic. Skills taught to members include but are not limited to advanced battlefield procedures such as airway management and support, hemorrhage control, cardiac life support, difficult IV access etc. Ops Medics are proficient in all forms of trauma-related treatment procedures as well as emergent medical emergencies.
- Supplemental Diving and Aviation Medicine courses.
- Driving and Maintenance: During this phase the candidate learns how to operate various military vehicles including the armored and mine-protected Mfezi Ambulance.
- Advanced Battle Training: During this phase candidates are taught the specialized infantry combat tactics associated with the Special and Airborne forces. In addition members also receive extensive training in both SANDF and foreign light and heavy weapons.
- Wilderness Survival.
- COLET: The SANDF College of Education and Training (COLET) offers a series of courses where members learn instructional, assessment and moderation skills, which has equipped 7 Med instructors with the required knowledge to present various classes relevant to the unit's core business. (7 Med Bn Gp members successfully trained UNITA and other groups in emergency medical procedures during the Angolan bush war).
- Rope-work: During this air-mobile training phase candidates learn to fast-rope and abseil, do rope withdrawal (hot extraction) and combat climbing techniques. Some members will also progress onto advanced rope-work courses such as High Angle Rescue.
- SWAT: Special Weapons and Tactics commonly known as Urban Combat Survival, presented by the South African Police Service.
- Basic Chemical and Biological Defence Instructor course.
- Parachute Course: Static Line Military Parachute course presented by 44 Parachute Regiment. 7 Medical Battalion Group generally has an extremely high pass rate during the parachute selection held at 44 Parachute Brigade. This is due to the stringent pre-selection of candidates and the physical training program. Candidates who do not perform well on the unit physical fitness evaluation are not allowed to attempt the 44 Parachute Regiment selection.

=== Advanced training ===
- Free Fall Parachuting
- HALO/HAHO (High Altitude Parachuting)
- VIP Close Protection course
- Combat Search and Rescue (CSAR)
- Advanced High angle Rescue
- CBW Cell (advisor)
- Explosive Ordnance Disposal (EOD)
- Combat Demolitions
- Hyperbaric Chamber Operator
- Diving Medicine
- Aviation Medicine
- Heavy/Light Squad Weapons
- Foreign Weapons
- Light and heavy vehicle rescue
- Disaster Management and Mass Casualty Evacuation
- HAZMAT

Members deployed at Satellite Special Forces units occasionally do specialist courses to enable them to better support their clients. Such courses can include Small Boat coxswain and Airborne Battle Handling etc.

== Proficiency Insignia ==
To match the evolution of military operations, the unit has reviewed the foundational skills set required by a Special Airborne Services (SAS) Operator as well as the introduction of various alternative career paths. The SAS acronym has been adopted to pay homage to the British Special Air Service whose approaches to selection and training were used as benchmarks by 7 Med instructors. The new proficiency insignia reflects the commando dagger, the universal symbol of special forces, an eagle to symbolise the unit's airborne heritage as well as an atom using Rutherford modeling denoting its role as the primary CBRNE unit of the SANDF.

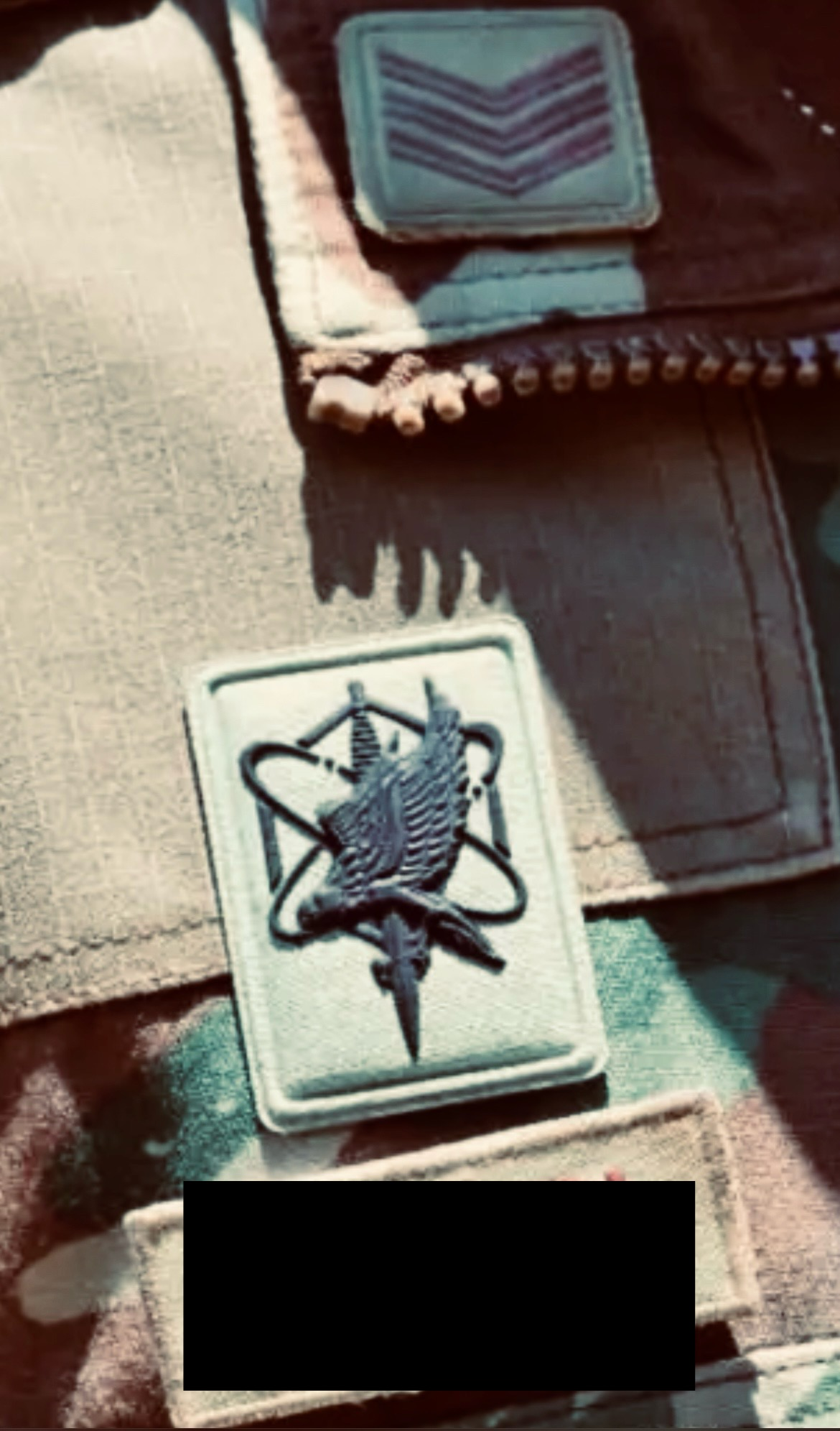
7 Medical Battalion Group Sergeant donning the SAS Operator Insignia

Unlike the rest of the SAMHS insignia, 7 Medical Battalion's caduceus insignia differs by virtue of it having a dagger instead of a staff.

Proficiency insignia of 7 Medical Battalion
Proficiency	Medical Doctor	Ops Medic
7 Medical Battalion		

== Equipment ==
=== Air Droppable Surgical Post/Resuscitation post ===
A Jakkals Jeep is shown packed ready for airdrop similarly to the packed Surgical post

The Unit developed an air-droppable surgical post/resuscitation post. The post is air dropped by parachute or air landed by helicopter or heavy lift aircraft. The Jakkals air-droppable jeep was used until recently, when it was replaced by the Gecko.

The Battalion is capable of erecting a fully functional operating theatre within minutes and can receive patients from the battlefield within an hour. At the post priority patients are stabilized prior to evacuation down the evacuation line.

Members of the battalion are encouraged to do the tandem parachute course to enable non-parachute qualified personnel like medical specialists from the SAMHS to be tandem-parachuted in if necessary.

=== Weapons ===
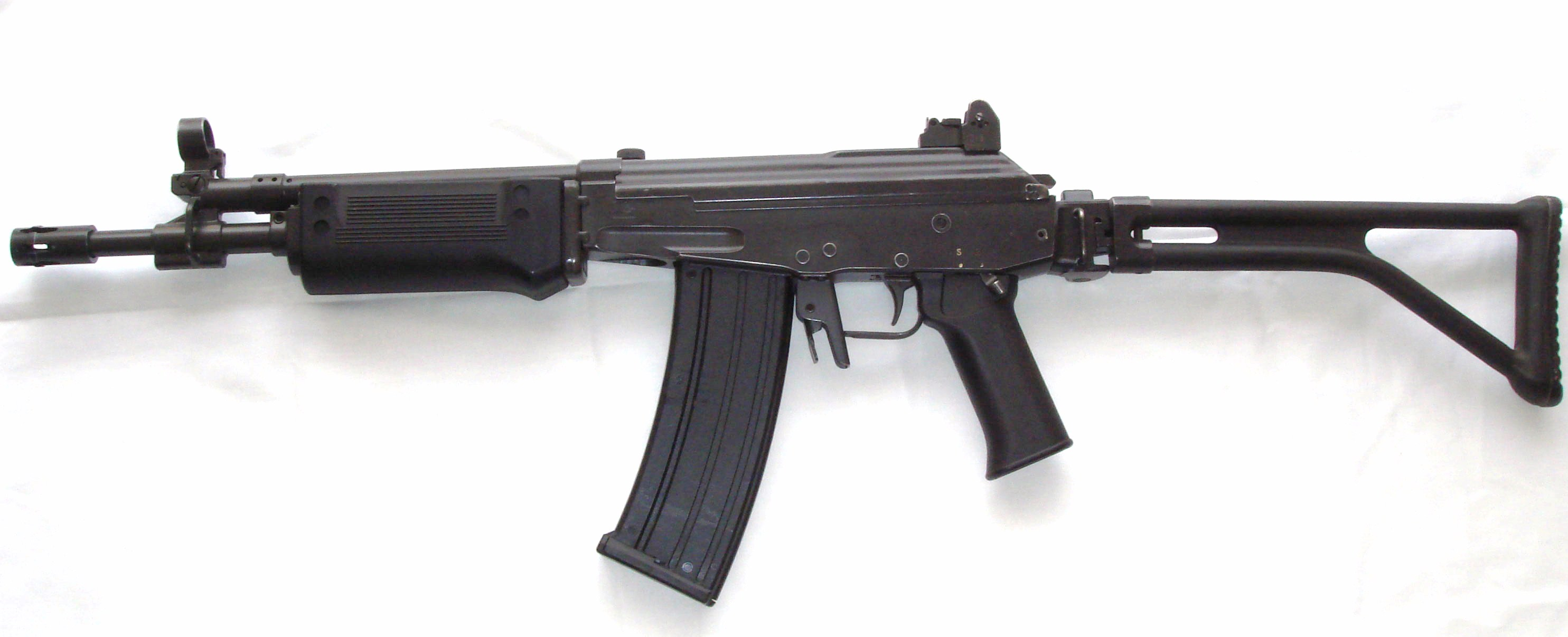
R5 Assault Rifle 556x45mm (.223)

Weapons carried depends on the type of operation, normally a member will be armed with an R5 or R4 assault rifle and sometimes with a side arm as well, for example the 9mm Beretta 92. It is not uncommon that the member is issued the same weapons as those of the unit he supports. Depending on the situation, these weapons can be either specialist or foreign in origin.

=== Medical Bags ===
The Unit developed jump ready medical bags that can be attached to a parachute harness enabling the member to parachute with the medical equipment. The bags are packed to support a section of paratroopers for 72 hours. South African air assault operations are planned to be self sufficient for 72 hours before resupply and/or link up with a larger force.

=== Vehicles ===
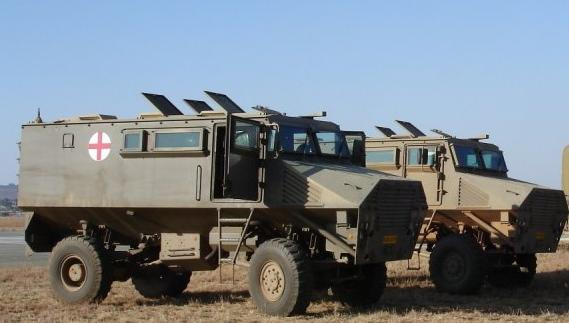
Mfezi Ambulance

Mfezi Ambulance the Mfezi is the workhorse of all Operational Medics and the men from 7 Med also use the 17 ton armoured ambulance during operations.

==== Jakkals Jeep ====
The Jakkals Jeep (air-delivered) was used by the Airborne forces on the battlefield/Landing Zones and was the work-horse used by 7 Med to transport heavy equipment like Surgical posts, casualties and other equipment around the landing zones. The Jakkals was replaced by the Gecko in 2003.

== Equipment used by the Chemical Biological Wing ==
The Chemical Biological wing developed an armored and mine protected field laboratory with CW filtered overpressure systems. Originally named Okapi MPV and later Sea Legs the vehicle was based on a fire control and communications platform. Later advanced chemical detection systems were trialed in the vehicle but eventually it was abandoned due to cost and a shift in doctrine.

Specialist detection and decontamination equipment were developed to be mounted on commercially available vehicles. Various modules can be mounted on appropriate vehicles as required by the mission thereby greatly simplifying logistical support. It is rumored that some home-grown systems developed by 7 Med for mass personnel decontamination can be deployed fully functional in less than 10 minutes.

== Detached units ==
The Battalion has several units of section sized medical teams permanently detached to the Special Forces and Parachute Regiment tasked to render medical support on a permanent basis to the attached regiment or unit. Members of the battalion rotate between the host units although some members choose to be permanently stationed at one of the detachments.

- 44 Medical Task Group
  Based at 44 Parachute Regiment, Tempe, Bloemfontein, Free State. It consists of a platoon-sized medical group consisting of Operational Medical Support Operators or Ops Medics. All qualified members of the Task Group are static line parachute qualified. Selected members are Freefall, HALO/HAHO and or Tandem parachute qualified enabling the Task Group to support the Parachute Battalions, Parachute School and Regiment in the full spectrum of requirements. Previous commanders have included Cmdt Kriek Williamson.
- 4 Special Forces Medical Task Team
  Based at 4 Special Forces Regiment, Langebaan, Western Cape.
- 5 Special Forces Medical Task Team
  Based at 5 Special Forces Regiment, Phalaborwa, Limpopo Province.
- Presidential Medical Unit
  7 Med Bn Gp took over command from Northern Medical Command in support of the Presidential protection unit PPU briefly before the establishment of the Presidential Medical Unit.

== See also ==
- South African Military Health Service
- Operational Medical Orderly
- South Africa and weapons of mass destruction, section Biological and chemical weapons
