= Operational Medical Orderly =

- Ops medic qualification badge
- Country: South Africa
- Branch: South African Military Health Service
- Type: Military Medical Support
- Motto: "Audaces Servamus" Serving the Brave

The Operational Medical Orderly, better known as the Ops Medic is the collective name for the South African Defence Forces Operationally trained Medics. The Ops refers to the Operational area and was used to indicate that the medical orderlies deployed to the Operational area or theatre of operations of the then South African Defence Force (SADF). The Operational area referred to the border or cutline between Namibia and Angola where the Angolan Bush War conflict or border war was taking place from the 1970s to 1989.

The Ops medics was distinctly different from the Sick Bay and Hospital medics of the time because Ops Medics were trained in infantry and mechanised fighting doctrines and other doctrines as necessary to deploy with the armed forces of South Africa.

Until the early 1990s the South African Surgeon General authorised Ops Medics trained by and qualified in the SADF/South African National Defence Force (SANDF) to work within their scope of practice while treating SADF/SANDF personnel. In the late 1990s the Health Professions Council required all practising Ops medics to register with the council to practice in South Africa and during South African Military operations worldwide.

Ops Medics are carried on a separate Operational Emergency Care Orderly roll of the Professional Board for Emergency Care of the HPCSA, although many have chosen to either dual register as Ambulance Emergency Assistants (Intermediate Life Support, Civilian Qualification) or to forgo registration as Operational Emergency Medical Orderlies in favour of registering as AEA's instead. This is motivated by the OECO qualification frequently being poorly understood in the civilian emergency care community, so Ops Medics wishing to moonlight while in service, or seeking EMS employment after leaving military service often find it easier to do so when registered as an AEA rather than as an OECO.

The structure of OECO training has changed over the years, and is no longer a stand-alone course as was previously the case. Currently prospective OECOs are trained first to the civilian Basic (BAA) and Intermediate Life Support (AEA) standard, and are then undergoing further military emergency care training to qualify them as a fully-fledged OECO. In line with the move away from the "short-course" emergency care programmes in emergency care in South Africa, the OECO course was phased out by 2015, replaced in its entirety by the newly introduced 2-year Emergency Care Technician national certificate. As is currently the case with OECO training, military ECTs are first trained in the baseline civilian qualification, and then undergo further military specific emergency care training. The ECT course was introduced in the South African Military Health Service (SAMHS) in 2008, and replaced the OECO course entirely by 2016.

== History ==
In 1975 the South African Defence Force launched Operation Savannah; Warrant Officer II Rowley Medlin of the South African Medical Service (SAMS) was ordered to prepare a national service intake for medical operational duty.

"In about July 1975 I was called in and was told to take over the training of the RMOs. At that stage we were starting to call them [unofficially] Ops Medics because they were going into the Operational Area. At that stage it was all south of the Angolan/South West African border. I was briefed that these chaps had to be highly trained. They had to be able to go out with the infantry, the artillery, the armour. They had to be familiar with their tactics [sic] and be able to function as medical orderlies. I had to devise my own training programme at that stage. I was given a three-month training period which I was quite happy with. I divided it into six weeks of medical work and six weeks of field training. I started with my first batch [July 1975] and it went quite well. Just before the end of the three months I was given orders to dispatch them immediately to the border, which I did. I got in another batch; we started training. At that stage I did not have a company commander, the officer commanding … was … Brigadier Daantjie Brink. This [the nascent 'Ops Medic' course] was totally my baby." Warrant Officer II Rowley Medlin

In 1979 the SAMS started structuring of the medical battalion group concepts instead of the Field Ambulance system of the World War II-Korean War era. It is here with the formation of the medical battalion group concept that the Operational medical orderly came into play, "to be deployed operationally with the fighting forces at platoon level." Commandant Gerhard (Vonk) Beukes: SAMS

== Training cycle ==
Aspirant Ops Medics first have to complete the South African National Defense Force's Basic Military Training at any one of the four arms of service. On completion of basics the aspirant can apply to become an Operational Medic. The South African Military Health Services conduct their own basic military training and the nucleus of students come from these intakes.

Aspiring Operational Medical Orderlies had to pass the Basic life support course. Aspirant candidates are required to pass the BLS level III course and achieve a minimum of 70% prior to be allowed on the Ops Course. A fitness test equal to the SADF fitness test also had to be passed. They were then transferred to what was known as OPS Company for training. The Training Cycle consisted of the following.

=== Medical phase ===
Medical Phase are divided in two phases a theoretical part and a hospital phase.

The Ops Medics are fortunate to do a practical phase in hospitals who serve some of the most violent neighbourhoods in South Africa namely Chris Hani Baragwanath Hospital, Leratong and Kalafong. At these hospitals the aspirant health practitioner could easily witness and treat horrific injuries not unlike to be expected on military operations. These hospitals service some of the worst townships in the country where faction-fighting is common.

The aspirant medic will during this phase deliver babies, treat emergencies like intracostal drains, severe burns, gunshot wounds, stabbings etc. After completion of the hospital phase the Ops medic would have inserted countless drips, suitered countless wounds and delivered a lot of babies. He would be ready to go into the Operational area and do hearts and minds operations by treating the local population in remote areas where the nearest hospital could be hundreds of kilometers away. He would also be able to handle anything expected in war. In later years the Ops Medics were also allowed on the emergency response vehicles where they were even more exposed to emergency care on the streets of Johannesburg.

During the theoretical phase the candidates were taught everything they were likely to encounter. They were also taught a very comprehensive pharmacological course to dispense medicine in remote areas. Subjects covered were:

- Anatomy & Physiology
- Pharmacology (Emergency and Primary Health Care drugs)
- Emergency Care
- Primary Health Care
- Environmental & Personal Hygiene

The required pass rate per module was 70% with rewrites only allowed for a mark between 60-69% a lower mark was returned to unit (RTU) where they were either used in the sickbays or used as ward medics in the Military Base Hospitals (MBH). Only one rewrite was allowed on the course and it sometimes happened that a student fell off the course in last and final week of evaluations.

=== Driving and maintenance ===
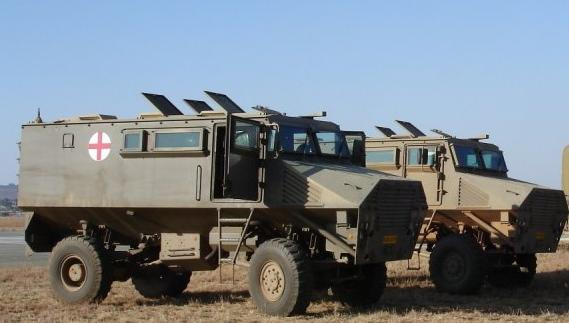
Mfezi ambulance

Driving and maintenance of military vehicles including the Casspir, Rinkhals and Mfezi Ambulance. (All armoured)

=== COIN ===
During this bush phase the Ops Medic were taught infantry fighting skills as required for deployment with the armed forces.

== Detached duty and the Medical Battalion Groups ==
After completion of Ops Company the Ops Medics were detached to a Medical Command or Medical Battalion Group under the Command of the parent unit the Ops Medic would be attached to the Infantry and other units during operations and exercises to return to the unit after completion of detached duty.

Ops Medics also supported the South African Police and Koevoet during operations. The SAMHS were structured with 8 Medical Battalion Groups.

== See also ==
- South African Military Health Service
- 7 Medical Battalion Group
- 1 Medical Battalion Group
- 6 Medical Battalion Group
