= Richard Frank Rand =

- Born: 1858? Plaistow, Essex, England
- Died: January 1937; Brighlingsea, Essex
- Education: University of Edinburgh
- Known for: Discoveries in botany found at Kew and bear his name. He served with distinction during the South African war.
- Scientific career
- Thesis: Experiences in Microscopic Technique (1889)

Richard Frank Rand (1858? – January 1937) was educated at the University of Edinburgh. He won the Wightman prize in 1880, and served as demonstrator of anatomy.

He acted as house surgeon at the Oldham Infirmary, and after taking his FRCS went to the West Indies where he practised for some years in Jamaica. From 1910 to 1935 he was again at Salisbury, but took part in the war of 1914–18 in the campaigns in South-West Africa and in East Africa. Retiring in 1935 he settled at Brightlingsea, Essex, where he died on 3 January 1937. Rand was interested in botany and many of his discoveries in South African flora are to be found at Kew and there bear his name. His gifts to the British Museum herbarium were described in the Journal of Botany.

== Early life ==
British medical doctor, Rand was born in Plaistow, Essex and qualified in medicine at the University of Edinburgh. He completed his MD in 1889 entitled 'Experiences in Microscopical Technique'. Other qualifications were MRCS and FRCS 13 December 1883. Early in his career, as a newly qualified doctor in the West Indies he had his hearing impaired by a severe attack of yellow fever that left him with impaired with chronic deafness.

== Career ==
Rand, a young surgeon trained at Edinburgh. In 1890 he migrated to South Africa and volunteered for service with the expedition which Cecil Rhodes organized to occupy Mashonaland. As medical officer to the Chartered Company's police, and later chief hospital surgeon at Fort Salisbury, he devoted himself specially to the treatment of malaria, the scourge of the early settlers and then not recognised as a mosquito-borne disease. In 1895-99 Rand was surgeon to the Fort Salisbury Hospital. In this position he did such good work that he was offered a knighthood, which he declined on the ground that he could not afford it. The hospital was a wattle-and-daub building, to which drugs and supplies had to be brought by bullock wagons over 1000 miles of rough track rendered almost impassable for many weeks during the rainy season. His duties took him on horseback to the outlying camps of prospectors and traders ill of malaria and dysentery aggravated by an absence of the elementary necessities of existence. He served with distinction during the South African War, when he was put in charge of the military hospital on Roberts Heights, and on its conclusion he returned to England, giving as his address, during 1900–09, 30 Bury Street, St James's, SW. London. From 1910 to 1935 he was again at Salisbury, and took part in the war of 1914–18 in the campaigns in South-West Africa and in East Africa.

== Later life ==
During the First World War he served with the South African Medical Corps in South West Africa, and later lived for some time in the Transvaal. He is remembered for his invention, "Rand's Kicker", an anti-malarial treatment consisting of quinine and cheap South African brandy. In 1926 he collected around Miami (now in Zimbabwe) while visiting the area on mining business. The London Journal of Botany published his "Wayside observations" from various field trips in Zimbabwe and South Africa between 1904 and 1926. Many species have been named after him including Moraea randii Rendle, Holothrix randii Rendle, Melhania randii Baker f., Buchnera randii S. Moore, Lopholoena randii S. Moore and Harveya randii Hiern. Retiring in 1935 he settled at Brightlingsea, Essex, where he died on 3 January 1937.
