= Mfezi =

Mfezi is a Zulu word meaning "snake". In particular, it applies to:

- The Mfezi, an armoured ambulance used by the South African Military Health Service;
- The Mozambique spitting cobra, Naja mossambica.
