= 8 Mobile Hospital =

- Active: 1972 – 1981
- Country: (South Africa)
- Branch: South African Medical Service
- Type: Citizen Force
- Motto(s): Audaces Servamus - We Serve the Brave
- Engagements: Border War

Commanders
- Notable commanders: Cmdt F.W. te Groen (6 Jun 1972 - 5 Nov 1981)

8 Mobile Hospital (8 Mob Hosp) was a mobile hospital in the South African Medical Service (SAMS), part of the South African Defence Force (SADF). As a Citizen Force unit, it was roughly equivalent to a Clinical Wing in the current medical battalion in the SANDF or a mobile field hospital. The unit was based in Pretoria in the Transvaal province of South Africa.

== Structure ==
The command structure of the unit was composed of an Officer Commanding, a Regimental Sergeant Major, a Chaplain and an Adjutant.

== Equipment ==
=== Weaponry ===
The main personal weapon of operationally deployed members of the unit was the R1 Assault Rifle, whilst Warrant Officers and Officers were usually issued with a 9mm pistol as a personal sidearm.

- South African military ranks

== Disbanding ==
8 Mobile Hospital was disbanded on 5 November 1981, when the majority of the serving and active members were incorporated into 6 Medical Battalion Group.

== See also ==
- Mobile hospital
- Field hospital
- Forward surgical teams
- Hospital ship
- List of former United States Army medical units
- Mobile Army Surgical Hospital (MASH)
