= 73 Motorised Brigade =

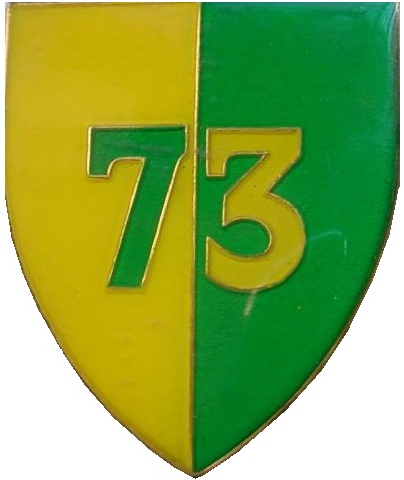
- 73 Motorised Brigade emblem
- Active: 1974–1992
- Country: South Africa
- Allegiance: South Africa
- Branch: South African Army
- Type: Motorised Brigade
- Part of: South African Composite Brigade
- Garrison: Witwatersrand Command Complex, Vereeniging and later Kensington
- Nickname: 73 Mot
- Equipment: Ratel; Eland Mk7 90mm and 60mm Armoured Cars; Buffel; G2
- Engagements: South African Border War

Insignia
- 73 Mot Brigade Command Bar

73 Motorised Brigade was a Formation of 7 South African Infantry Division, a combined arms force consisting of infantry, armour and artillery.

== History ==
=== Origin ===
==== 19 Brigade ====
71 Brigade can trace its origins back to a structure in the late 1960s, called 19 Brigade, which was headquartered at the Witwatersrand Command Complex. On 1 August 1974, through a reorganization of the Army’s conventional force, the name was changed to 73 Motorised Brigade.

==== Initial Structure ====
Under this reorganisation, the following units were transferred from Witwatersrand Command to the new command:

- Witwatersrand Rifles,
- Regiment Oos Rand,
- Pretoria Highlanders,
- Regiment Vrystaat,
- 18 Field Squadron,
- 73 Signal Squadron,
- 10 Maintenance Unit,
- 29 Field Workshop and
- a Field Ambulance.

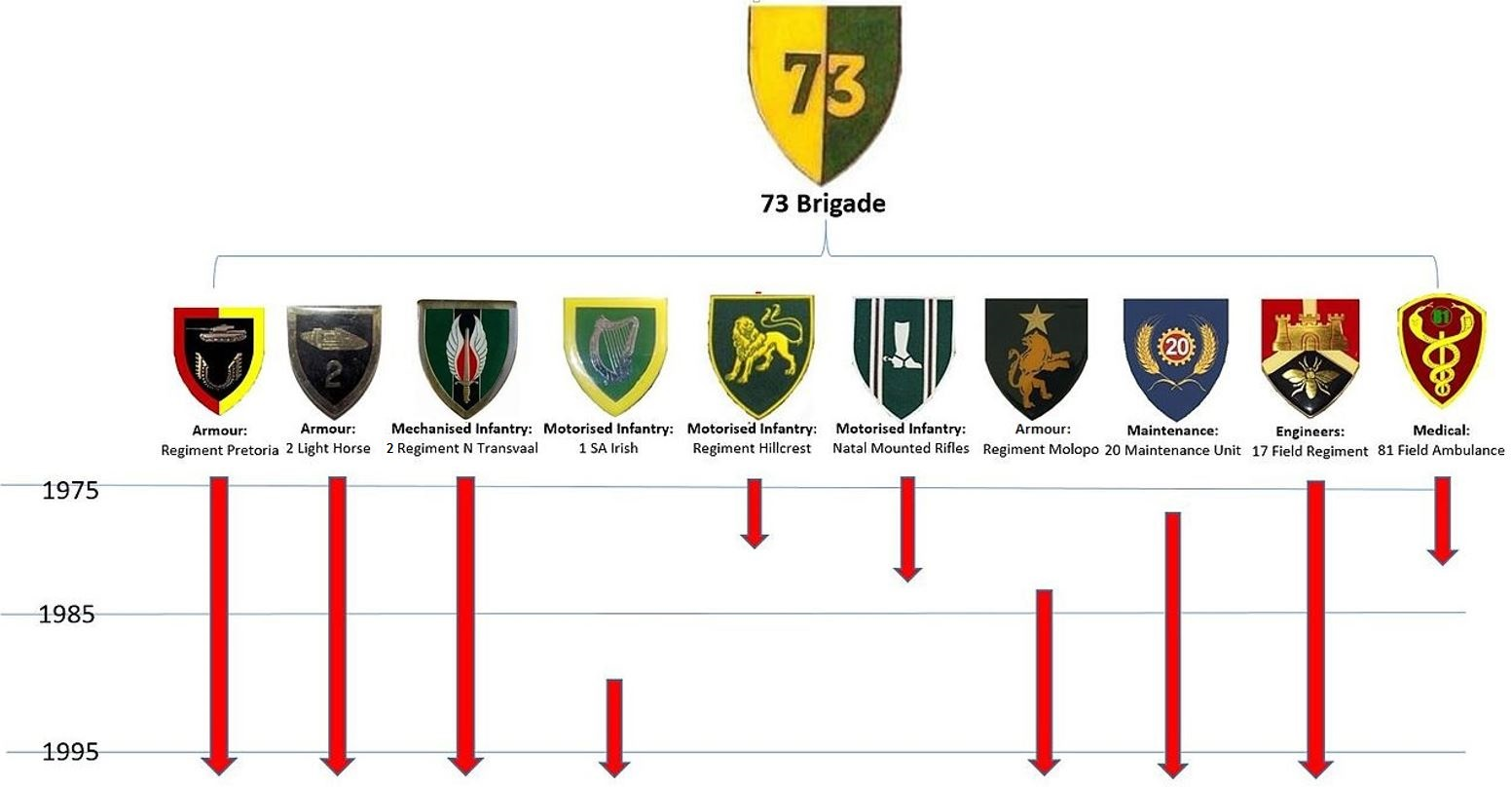
SADF 7 Division 73 Brigade associated units over time

==== Higher Command ====
73 Motorised Brigade initially resorted under the Chief of the Army until July 1986 but was then transferred to 7 Division. Eventually the entire Brigade resorted under Far North Command.

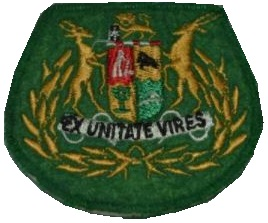
SADF era Brigade level Sergeant Major insignia

=== Brigade Training and Exercises ===
73 Motorised Brigade would generally make use of the General de Wet Training Range, Tempe, near Bloemfontein. Notably 73 Motorised Brigade was involved in Exercise Thunder Chariot, a Divisional exercise held since 1956, at the Army Battle School. Other exercises included:

- Exercise Aggressor 1
- Exercise Turning Wheel
- Exercise Excalibur
- Exercise Ysbeer both on Lohatla

=== Operational Activation ===
As a Citizen Force structure, 73 Motorised Brigade would make use of call-up orders for its personnel to generally report for 3 months service. Headquarters staff would then leave for Tempe near Bloemfontein, where a transfer camp would be established to process troops en route to the operational area in northern South West Africa. Processing of units would include personal documentation, a medical examination, inoculation and the issuing of equipment and weapons. Each unit on completion of the necessary processing, would entrain to the Olienhoutplaat Station for a six-day journey to Grootfontein, the railhead near the Operational Area.

==== Changes over time ====
73 Motorised Brigade structure was not static, units were substituted as needs were adapted to Two units arrived in 73 Brigade in 1984, namely Rand Light Infantry and 7 Medium Regiment. By 1986 7 Medium Regiment was transferred under direct control of 7 Division but Regiment Uitenhage was transferred in. In 1989 Rand Light Infantry was transferred to Far North Command while the Pretoria Highlanders was added to the Brigade.

===== From a Conventional Brigade to a COIN Brigade =====
With the independence of Namibia, the conventional threat dissipated and the Army Command began a process of rationalisation. Brigade headquarters were now focussed on counter-insurgency support to regional commands.

== Insignia ==
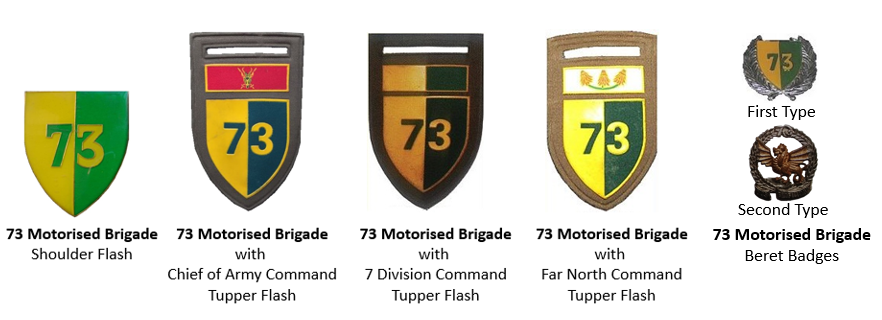
SADF era 73 Motorised Brigade insignia

== Leadership ==
Leadership
From	Officer Commanding	To	Ribbon
1974	Brig E.L. Bekker		
1974	Col J.S. van Heerden	1975	
1976	Col T. Hanekom	1977	
1978	Col Y. de Bruin	1980	
1981	Col J.H.E. Aveling	1983	
1984	Col D.M. Nel	1987	
1990	Col B. van Heerden		
