= Nicolaas Nieuwoudt =

South African general and Doctor (1929–1989)

Lieutenant General Nicolaas Johan Nieuwoudt SSA SD SM
- Born: 23 October 1929; Louisvale, Northern Cape
- Died: 22 November 1989 (aged 60)
- Relatives: Ina Pretorius (Wife)
- Military career
- Allegiance: South Africa
- Branch: South African Military Health Service
- Service years: 1960–1988
- Rank: Lieutenant General
- Awards

Lieutenant-General Nicolaas Nieuwoudt MBChB SSA SD SM (1929–1989) was a South African military commander. A medical doctor, he joined the South African Air Force's medical branch in 1960, after five years private practise. He commanded the South African Medical Service, as Surgeon-General, from 1977 to 1988. He also commanded the secretive South African chemical and biological weapons program, known as Project Coast from 1981 to 1988.

== Education ==
He obtained a medical degree from the University of Pretoria

== Honours and awards ==
He was awarded the following medals and decorations:

- 1985 – Star of South Africa (1952) (SSA)
- 1980 – Southern Cross Decoration (SD)
- 1964 – Southern Cross Medal (1952) (SM)
- 1984 – Pro Patria Medal
- 1979 – Order of the Cloud and Banner (2^{nd} Grade - with Grand Cordon) (ORB)
- 1980 – The Order of Military Merit, degree 'Grand Officer' Paraguay

== See also ==
- List of South African military chiefs
- South African Medical Service

Government offices
Preceded by Petrus J.V.E. Pretorius	Commissioner General Lebowa; 1988 – 1989	Succeeded by J. Martin Koekemoer
Military offices
Preceded by Colin Cockcroft	Chief of the South African Medical Service; 1977 – 1988	Succeeded by Daniel Knobel
