= Colin Cockcroft =

South African general

Lieutenant General Dr. Colin Royden Cockcroft SSA SSA SD SM MMM, MBChB
- Born: 4 October 1917; Dordrecht, Cape Province, Union of South Africa (now Eastern Cape)
- Died: 30 June 1987 (aged 69)
- Spouse: Ellen Cornelia Johanna Peacock
- Military career
- Allegiance: South African Army
- Rank: Lieutenant General Dr.
- Awards

Lieutenant General Dr. Colin Royden Cockcroft SSA SSA SM SD SM MMM, MBChB (4 October 1917 – 5 December 1987) was a South African military commander.

A medical doctor, he served as Surgeon General of the South African Medical Service from 1969 to 1977.

== Early career ==
He obtained a MBChB degree from the University of the Witwatersrand in 1946 and later obtained a master's degree in pediatrics from the University of Pretoria

== Military career ==
He joined the South African Army's medical corps in 1947 but later resigned in 1948.

He served in 5 & 7 Field Ambulance in the Citizen Force until he joined the Permanent Force in 1960.

He commanded 1 Military Hospital (Pretoria), served as Deputy Surgeon General and later commanded the centralised South African Medical Service, as Surgeon-General, from 1969 to 1977, before he retired

== Awards and decorations ==
- Star of South Africa (Gold) (SSAG)
- Star of South Africa (1952) (SSA)
- Southern Cross Decoration (SD)
- Southern Cross Medal (1952) (SM)
- Military Merit Medal (MMM)

He also served on the South African Medical and Dental Council and was a member of the South African Academy of Art and Science. on 1 December 1973 he was appointed the first Honorary Professor of Medicine at the University of Pretoria

Military offices
Preceded by Eugene Raymond	Chief of the South African Medical Service; 1969–1977	Succeeded by Nicolaas Nieuwoudt
