= Eugene Raymond =

Major General Eugene Cremonx Raymond SSA SM
- Born: 17 May 1923
- Military career
- Allegiance: South Africa
- Service years: 1952–1969
- Rank: Major General
- Commands: Chief of SAMHS
- Awards

Major General Eugene Cremonx Raymond SSA SM (born 17 May 1923, date of death unknown) was a South African military commander. A medical doctor, he joined the South African Army's medical corps in 1952, and was appointed Surgeon-General at Defence Headquarters in 1960. When the medical services were centralised in 1968 he became the chief of the new organisation. He retired from military service in 1969. Raymond is deceased.

== Awards and decorations ==
- Star of South Africa (1952) (SSA)
- Southern Cross Medal (1952) (SM)

== See also ==
- List of South African military chiefs
- South African Medical Service

Military offices
New title	Chief of the South African Military Health Service; 1968–1969	Succeeded by Colin Cockcroft
