= 3 Medical Battalion Group =

- Active: 21 October 1899
- Country: South Africa
- Allegiance: Republic of South Africa
- Branch: South African Military Health Service
- Type: Reserve Force
- Part of: South African Department of Defence; SAMHS Conventional Reserve
- Garrison/HQ: Fort iKapa; Goodwood, Cape Town
- Motto: Semper Parati – Always Prepared
- Anniversaries: 21 October (Regimental Day)

3 Medical Battalion Group (3 Med) is a Medical Battalion in the South African Medical Health Services (SAMHS), part of the South African National Defence Force (SANDF). The unit falls under the command of the Mobile Military Health Formation. As a reserve unit, it has a status roughly equivalent to that of a British Army Reserve or United States Army National Guard unit. It is based at Fort iKapa military base in Goodwood, Cape Town in the Western Cape.

== History ==
3 Medical Battalion Group was established on 21 October 1899 as the Volunteer Medical Staff Corps in King William's Town in the present day Eastern Cape, then known as the Cape Colony.

The unit forms part of the Mobile Military Health Formation of the South African Military Health Services with the mandate to deliver comprehensive medical health services to the SANDF during conventional operations.

The Battalion Group received the right of freedom of entry into Cape Town on 23 October 2010.

== Honours ==
Three Medical Battalion Group's predecessor the Volunteer Medical Staff Corps was awarded the King's Colours by King Edward VII for its services rendered during the Anglo Boer War of 1899–1902. The unit was the only non-combat unit in South Africa to receive this honour from the British monarchy.
