= Regiment Vrystaat =

Armoured regiment of the South African Army

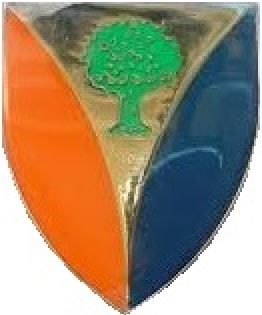
- Regiment Vrystaat emblem
- Country: South Africa
- Allegiance: Republic of South Africa; Republic of South Africa
- Branch: South African Army; South African Army
- Type: Armoured Regiment
- Part of: South African Armoured Corps; Army Conventional Reserve
- Garrison/HQ: Bloemfontein
- Mottos: Libertas Virtus Fidelitas (Freedom; Power; Fealty)
- Equipment: Eland 90 armoured car
Battle honours
Battle Honours
Awarded
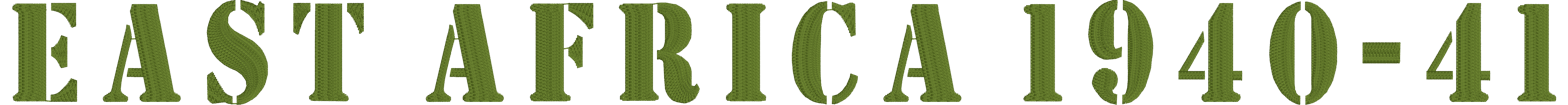

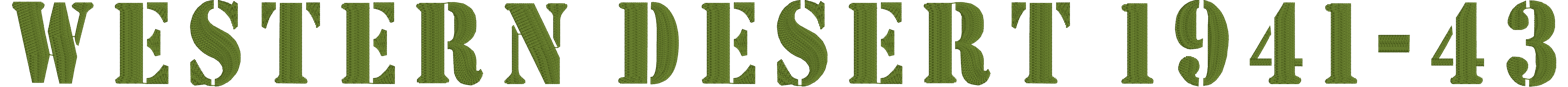

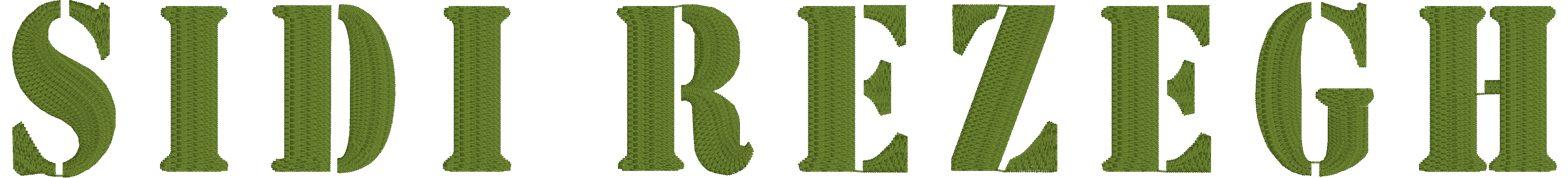

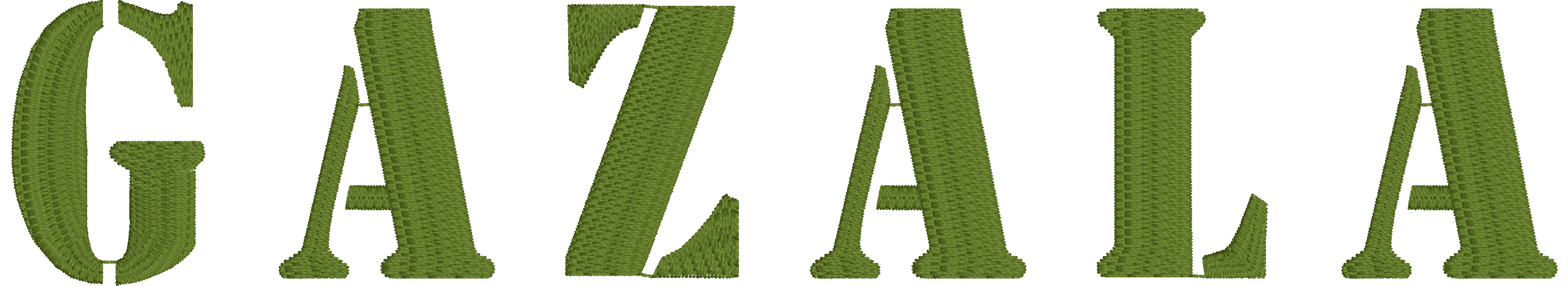

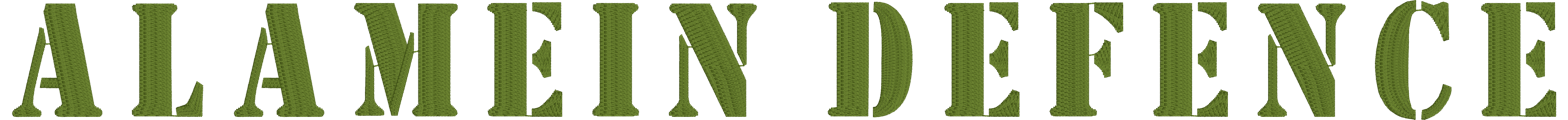

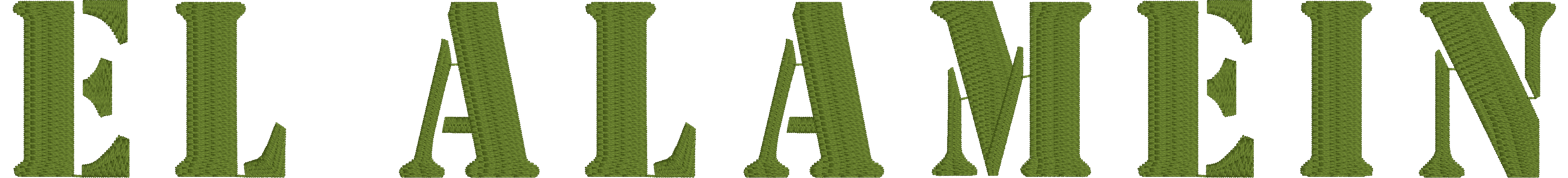

Commanders
- OC 1982: Commandant J.J. van der Merwe
- honorary Colonel (1982): Judge M.T. Steyn

Insignia
- Beret Colour: Black
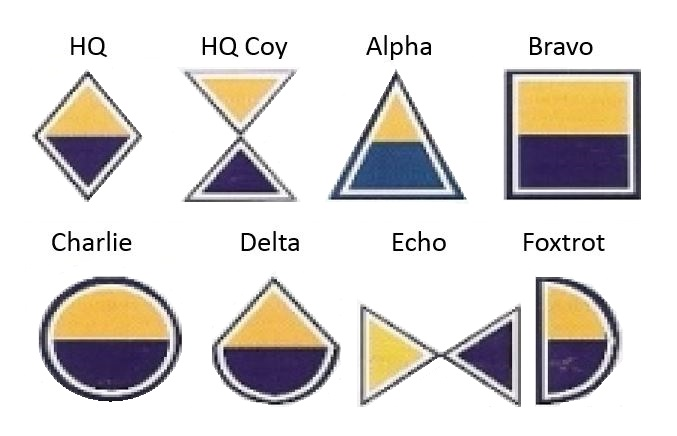
- Armour Squadron emblems

- Armour beret bar circa 1992

Regiment Vrystaat was an armoured regiment of the South African Army. As a reserve unit, it had a status roughly equivalent to that of a British Army Reserve or United States Army National Guard unit. Formed from 2 Regiment President Steyn which had been formed in 1975, when 1 Regiment President Steyn was converted to tanks and 2 Regiment President Steyn formed with armored cars. It was part of the South African Army Armour Formation.

== History ==
=== Origin ===
Originally designated 2 Regiment President Steyn on 1 August 1975, Regiment Vrystaat was only formed the following year by the transfer of excess personnel from Regiment President Steyn. At the same time a decision was taken to redesignate the unit.

=== Border War ===
Regiment Vrystaat's Eland-90 armoured cars saw service during the South African Border War.

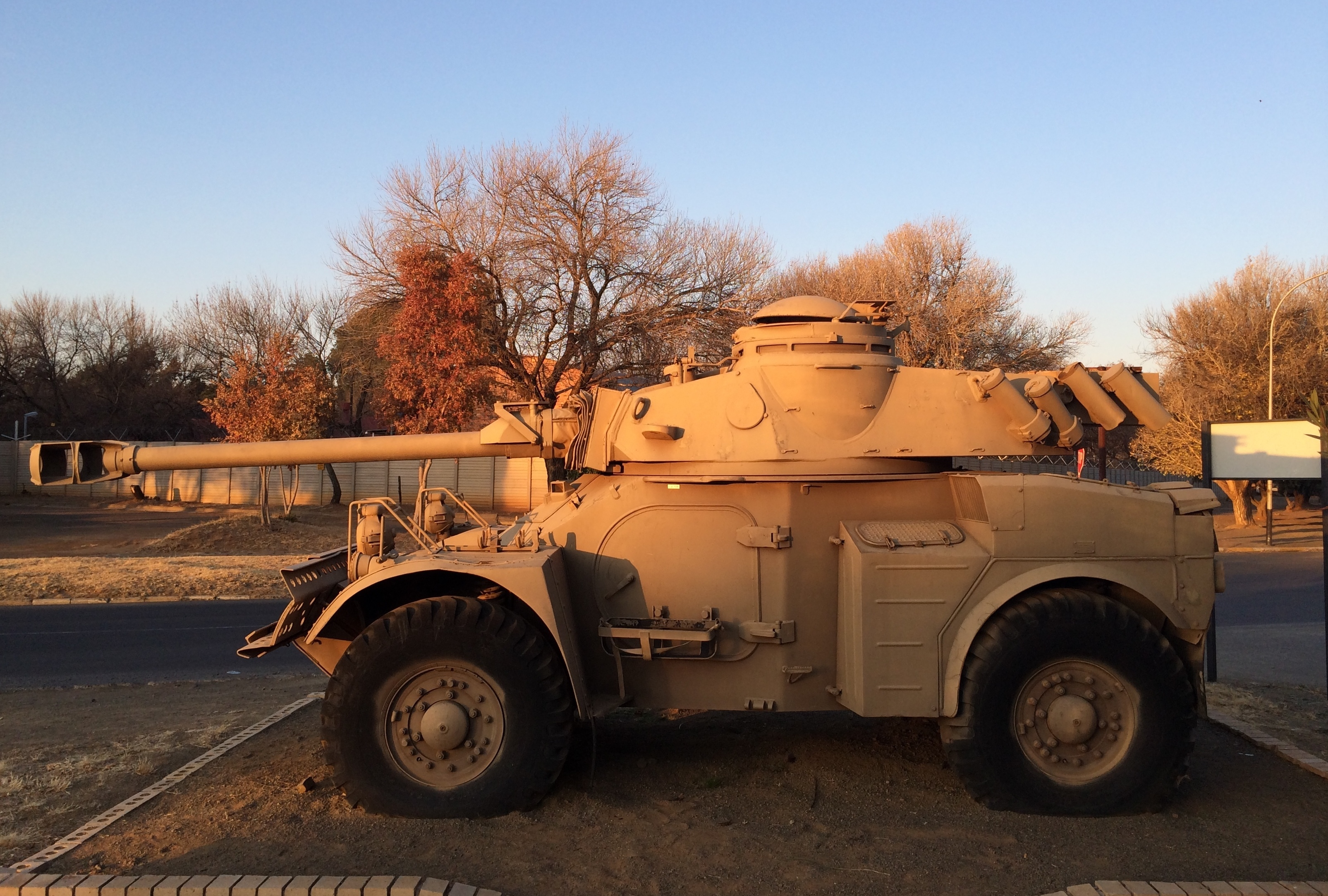
Eland facility marker at Tempe

The regiment conducted its first border operations in 1976. The regiment was at that stage one of very few conventional armoured car regiments in South Africa and acted as backup reserve for South African forces leaving Angola in that period.

Regiment Vrystaat conducted further border duty in 1977 and 1978.

The regiment supported Operations Hooper and Packer with 20 Ratel Drivers in 1988.

=== Affiliations ===
Regiment Vrystaat was assigned to 73 Motorised Brigade of 7 Division and then to 9 Division by 1991.

=== Reamalgamation ===
By 2000, the two regiments re-amalgamated and became a single regiment once again.

== Regimental symbols ==
=== Dress Insignia ===
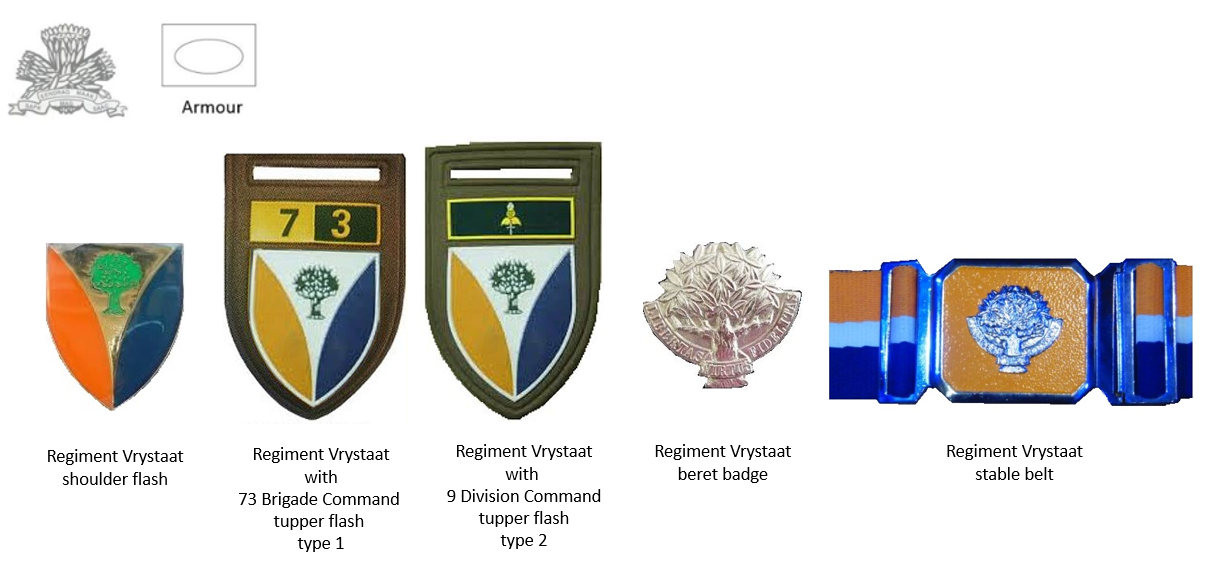
SADF era Regiment Vrystaat insignia

== Unit colours ==
Regiment Vrystaat retained the original colours of Regiment President Steyn which is old gold, white and black, but adopted the tree of freedom the Orange Free State as its unit badge.

== Officers Commanding ==
Leadership
From	Officer Commanding	To	Ribbon
1975	Cmdt Jurie van der Merwe	c. nd	
1991	Cmdt Andre de Beer	c. nd	
From	Regimental Sergeant Major	To	Ribbon
	No known incumbents		

== Battle honours ==
As an offshoot of Regiment President Steyn, Regiment Vrystaat was allowed to carry that units battle honours as well:

Battle Honours
Awarded to Regiment Vrystaat
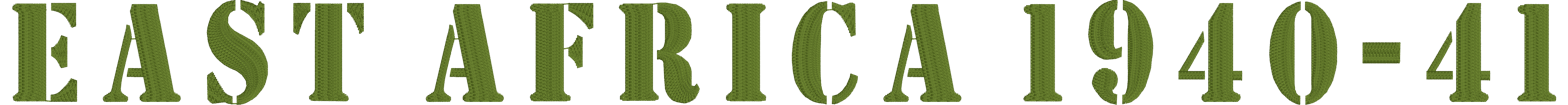
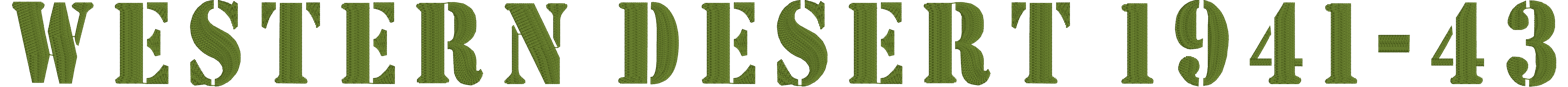
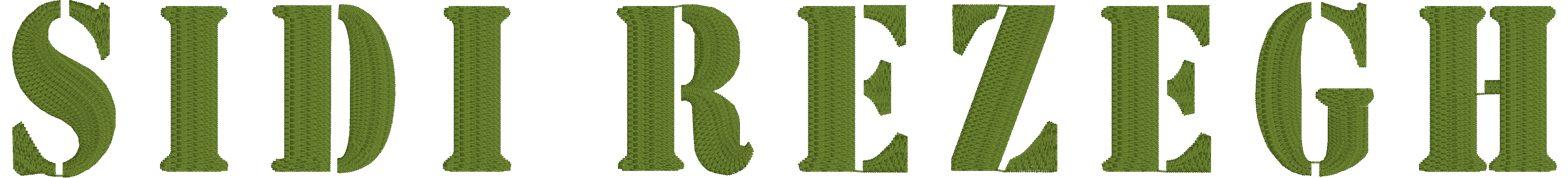
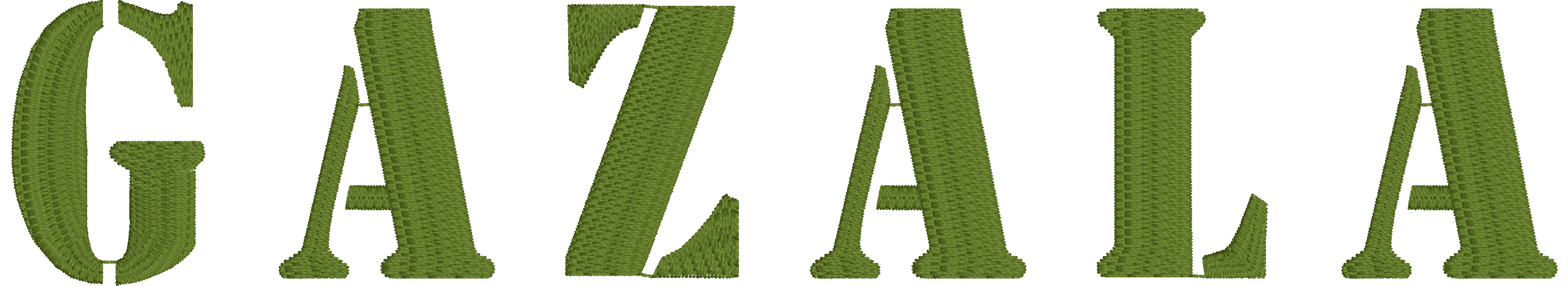
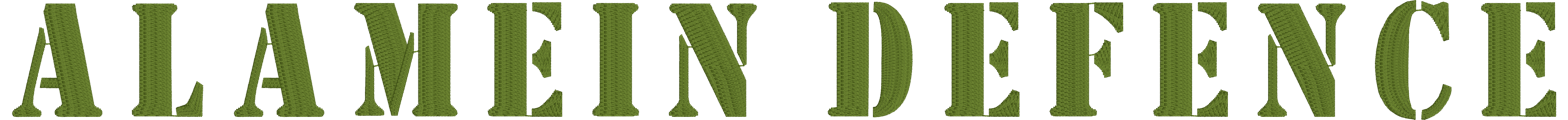
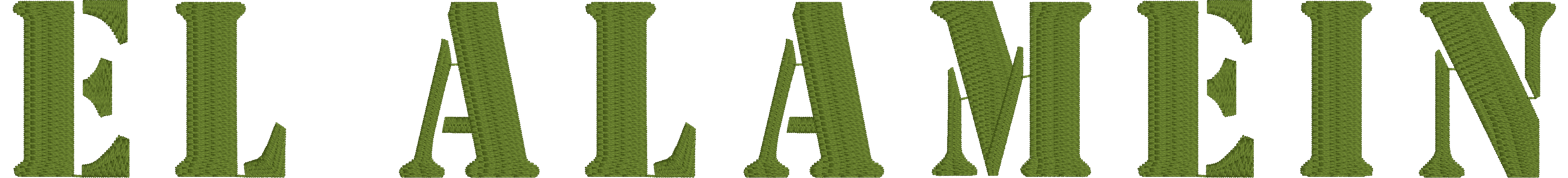

- East Africa 1940 - 1941
- Western Desert 1941 - 1943
- Sidi Rezegh
- Gazala
- Alamein Defence
- El Alamein
