= Mfezi (ambulance) =

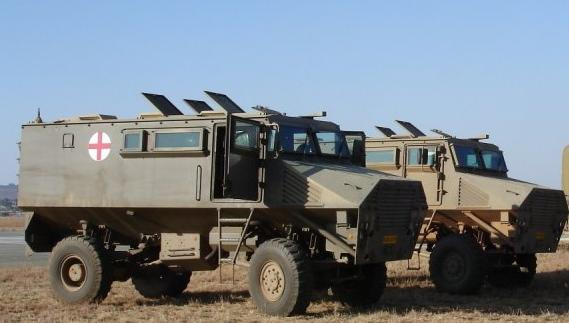
- Type: Armoured ambulance
- Place of origin: South Africa

Service history
- In service: 1990–2008

Specifications
- Length: 6.56 metres (7.17 yd)
- Width: 2.48 metres (2.71 yd)
- Height: 3.03 metres (3.31 yd)
- Crew: 1 Driver 2 × Orderlies
- Main armament: None, 4 × Gun Ports
- Engine: ADE 449T 9.51 litres (2.51 US gal) 5-cylinder diesel, 184kW @ 2100 rpm
- Suspension: 4×4 wheeled
- Operational range: 1,000 kilometres (620 mi) (road), 300 kilometres (190 mi) (cross country)
- Maximum speed: 90 kilometres per hour (56 mph) on road

The Mfezi is an armoured ambulance used by the South African Military Health Service. The name Mfezi is a Zulu word that means cobra. The snake is the emblem of the South African Operational Medical Orderly who operate and use these vehicles, therefore armoured ambulances are named for snakes in South African military service.

== History ==
The Mfezi replaced the Rinkhals armoured ambulance at the end of the Angolan Bush War although it is believed that one Mfezi ambulance was operationally tested in Angola during the closing stages of the Bush War.

== Design ==
The Mfezi is a 17 metric tons (37,000 lb) armoured vehicle capable of withstanding 3 × TM-57 landmines/21 kilograms (46 lb) TNT under any wheel and two TM-57/14 kilograms (31 lb) TNT under the hull. The sides are armoured to withstand up to 7.62×51mm small arms fire.

The Mfezi is operated by two medical orderlies and has the capacity to hold four patients lying down and four sitting. The configuration of the inside of the vehicle can be changed as needed according to the situation, although this requires a workshop intervention.

There have been instances where Ops Medics (Operational Emergency Care Orderlies) have removed a top stretcher to enable them to work on a seriously injured soldier without any hinderance.
