= 1 Medical Battalion Group =

- Active: 1895–current
- Country: South Africa
- Allegiance: Republic of South Africa
- Branch: South African Military Health Service
- Type: Reserve Force
- Part of: South African Department of Defence; SAMHS Conventional Reserve
- Motto: Non-Nobis Solum – Not For Ourselves Alone
- Engagements: Boer War; World War I World War II

1 Medical Battalion Group (1 Med) is a Medical Battalion in the South African Medical Health Services (SAMHS), part of the South African National Defence Force (SANDF). The unit falls under the command of the Mobile Military Health Formation. As a reserve unit, it has a status roughly equivalent to that of a British Army Reserve or United States Army National Guard unit. It is based in the city of Durban in KwaZulu-Natal, South Africa.

== History ==
1 Medical Battalion Group can trace its roots back to the Militia units of old Natal, dating back to 1895, when the Ambulance detachments of Durban Light Infantry, Natal Mounted Rifles and Natal Carbineers were merged to form the Natal Volunteer Medical Corps (NVMC).

== Anglo-Boer War and early years – 1914 ==
1899 saw the first active mobilisation of the Natal Volunteer Medical Corps in the Anglo Boer War where the Corps served with distinction with Imperial forces including the Seaforth Highlanders, their first association with the Highland Tartan.

The Militia Act of 1904 saw the change in name to Natal Medical Corps and as such they saw active service in the Bhambatha or Poll Tax Rebellion of 1906. The Natal Medical Corps was called up again in 1914 at the outbreak of the Rand Strikes until released from service in 1915 with thanks from the Government.

== The Great War 1914–1918 ==
The Natal Medical Corps was mobilised in 1914 and served in the South West African Campaign where they formed the 6th Stationary Hospital at Swakupmond and crewed the hospital ship 'Ebani'. Another section took part in the battle for Gideon against German forces. At the conclusion of the SWA Campaign the Field Ambulance was attached to the 1st Infantry Brigade and departed aboard HMT Kenilworth Castle from Cape Town for training at Royal Army Medical Corps Twezeldown on 10 October 1915. Following training the unit was shipped to Egypt aboard HMT Corsican, reaching Alexandria on 13 January 1916.

As the 'Natal Corps' of 1st South African Field Ambulance the unit was involved in most major battles including the Somme, Deville Wood, Ypres and Menin Road.

The Natal Medical Corps was again mobilised with other Natal Regiments and sent to the Reef during the Rand Strikes of 1922.

In the 1935 the Natal Medical Corps was designated 1st Field Ambulance and in 1939, and following the motivation of the Officer Commanding, Col. G.D. English, authority to wear the Mackenzie Tartan was granted to the unit. This unique honour was authorised by the Surgeon General and the Union Defence Force, after approval by the British War Office, The Countess of Cromach (Cromartie) as Head of Clan, and the Seaforth Highlanders.

== World War II ==
All medical units were pooled and new units numbers from 10 upwards. The members of 1st Field Ambulance formed the major component of 10 and 11 Field Ambulances wearing the Mackenzie Tartan behind their cap badges to maintain their identity. 10 and 11 Field Ambulances saw service in the Western Desert and Italy. 17 Field Ambulance which was formed during the war saw service with the Australians and was captured at the fall of Tobruk in 1943.

After the war, the Field Ambulances reverted to their original numbering.

== Internal unrest in South Africa ==
The Unit was mobilised in 1959/60 as part of Ops Duiker during the Cato Manor Riots. During Ops Letaba in Voortrekkerhoogte in 1961, helicopters were used for casualty evacuation for the first time, and members of 1st Field Ambulance were told they were in the 'forefront of modern warfare'.

In 2021 the group was mobilized to provide pre hospital emergency medical support to 'Operation Prosper' in Kwa-Zulu Natal. The operation was conducted by the South African National Defence Force to aid the South African Police Service to restore peace and order during the Kwa-Zulu Natal riots which took place during July 2021.

== The Border War and the formation of 1 Medical Battalion Group ==
After the Second World War the activities of the Unit were confined to reorganisation and training camps. The reinstated 17 Field Ambulance did Border duties and conventional operations in Angola in the late 70's. 1st Field Ambulance members were involved in detached duties in Northern Natal along the Mozambique border, and deployed in full strength in 1978 to test the new Field Ambulance system in Thabazimbi.

On 1 July 1979, the South African Medical Corps (SAMC), until that time a Corps of the Army, became the South African Medical Service (SAMS), the fourth arm of the South African Defence Force (SADF). On 6 July 1979, 1 Field Ambulance was awarded the Freedom of the City of Durban and in this year also provided the Guard of Honour for the first Durban Military Tattoo.

In 1980, the new Medical Battalion concept was tested during Ex Jumbo with the formation of 11 Medical Battalion, an amalgamation of all field ambulances. This concept was approved and adopted, and in November 1981, the two Durban Field Ambulances, 1 and 17, were merged into 1 Medical Battalion Group.

== Inherited traditions ==
All the traditions and history of both units were inherited by the new battalion, including the wearing of the Mackenzie Tartan behind the head dress badge. 1 Medical Battalion is considered one of a small number of traditional regiments in the SANDF.

In 1990, 1 Med adopted traditional Scottish regalia (or became kilted) for Officers, Warrant Officers, the Colour Party and The Pipe Band. The Battalion changed from the crimson SAMHS Beret to the Glengarry, a unique head dress in the SAMHS and adopted a Tartan stable belt for ceremonial wear. The Battalion reverted to the beret in 2006.

== Command structure ==
1 Medical Battalion Group Leadership
From	Honorary Colonel	To	Ribbon
TBA	Colonel Pieter J Breytenbach SD,SM,MMM,JCD	2019	Southern Cross Decoration SD Southern Cross Medal SM Military Merit Medal MMM John Chard Decoration JCD
From	Commanding Officers	To	Ribbon
1981	Colonel Erich Victor Vorwerk SM	1988	Southern Cross Medal SM
1988	Colonel Ian David Wallace SM,MMM	1991	Southern Cross Medal SM Military Merit Medal MMM
1991	Colonel Steven Patrick Knowles SM,MMM,JCD,OStJ	1995	Southern Cross Medal SM Military Merit Medal MMM John Chard Decoration JCD Venerable Order of Saint John OStJ
1995	Lt Colonel Andrew James Love SM,MMM (Note: Acting (Temporarily holding the post without confirmation))	1996	Southern Cross Medal SM Military Merit Medal MMM
1996	Colonel Jacobus Oostewald van Niekerk MMM,JCD,SBStJ	2003	Military Merit Medal MMM John Chard Decoration JCD Venerable Order of Saint John SBStJ
2003	Colonel Roedolf Louwrens Lodder SM,MMM,JCD	2006	Southern Cross Medal SM Military Merit Medal MMM John Chard Decoration JCD
2006	Colonel Devanathan Veeran Perumal	2013	
2013	Lt Colonel D. V. Ndlovu	Present	
From	Regimental Sergeants Major	To	Ribbon
1981	WO1 Paul Ernest Brockman PMD,PMM,MMM,JCD	2001	Pro Merito Decoration PMD Pro Merito Medal PMM Military Merit Medal MMM John Chard Decoration JCD
2001	WO1 David Leigh Curry MMM,JCD	2007	Military Merit Medal MMM John Chard Decoration JCD
2007	WO1 Keith Allan Harker MMM,JCD	2012	Military Merit Medal MMM John Chard Decoration JCD
2012	Unknown	Present	
