= South African Medical Service =

South African military branch

The South African Medical Service (SAMS) was a branch of the South African Defence Force (SADF). In 1994 when the SADF was merged with various other military and armed resistance forces as part of the post-apartheid reforms the SAMS became the South African Military Health Service of the South African National Defence Force. The SAMS operated three hospitals, 1 Military Hospital in Pretoria, 2 Military Hospital in Cape Town, and 3 Military Hospital in Bloemfontein. It also had three specialist institutes; the Institute for Aviation Medicine, the Institute for Maritime Medicine, and the Military Psychological Institute.

== History ==
The SA Defence Act Amendment Act, No. 22 of 1922 re-organised the Permanent Force. From 1 February 1923 the Permanent Force consisted a number of Corps, including the SA Medical Corps.

By that time three Medical Corps were already in existence, the Transvaal Medical Corps (established in 1903), the Natal Volunteer Medical Corps (established in 1899) and the Cape Medical Staff Corps.

Over the years, the following Corps formed part of the South African Army:

- SA Veterinary Corps (1913–46) - incorporated into SA Medical Corps (SAMC)
- SA Medical Corps (1913–70) - incorporated into South African Medical Service
- SA Military Nursing Service (1914–70)
- SA Military Nursing Corps (1970–72) - incorporated into SAMS

=== Organisation of Medical Corps in 1970s ===
In the late 1970's before the establishment of the South African Medical Service as an independent Arm of Service, the SA Army's Medical Corps' mobile elements were organised as follows:

Assigned to 1 SA Corps:

- 23 Mobile Hospital,
- 48 Field Ambulance Unit, and
- 26 Field Hygiene Company.

Assigned to 7 South African Infantry Division:

- 17 Mobile Hospital, and
- 17 Field Ambulance Unit,

as divisional troops, while each brigade had assigned a field ambulance unit (numbered 71, 72 and 73 respectively).

Assigned to 8th Armoured Division (South Africa):

- 18 Mobile Hospital and
- 18 Field Ambulance Unit,

as divisional troops, while each brigade had assigned a field ambulance unit (numbered 81, 82, 83 and 84 respectively).

The SAMS was established in July 1979 as a service branch of the SADF. The establishment combined the medical services of the Army, Navy and the Air Force. The head of the SAMS was the Surgeon-General who had the rank of Lieutenant-General. The role of the SAMS was to provide health and medical support services to the SADF, it included a veterinary section that looked after dogs and horses.

== Leadership ==
South African Medical Service
From	Surgeons General	To	Ribbon
1 February 1960	Maj Gen Eugene Raymond SSA,SM	31 March 1969	Star of South Africa SSA Southern Cross Medal SM
1 April 1969	Lt Gen Colin Cockcroft SSA,SM	31 October 1977	Star of South Africa SSA Southern Cross Medal SM
1 November 1977	Lt Gen Nicolaas Nieuwoudt SSA,SD,SM	29 February 1988	Star of South Africa SSA Southern Cross Decoration SD Southern Cross Medal SM
1 March 1988	Lt Gen Daniel Knobel SSAS,SD,SOE,SM,MMM,KStJ,PhD	27 April 1994	Star of South Africa SSAS Southern Cross Decoration SD South African Police Star for Outstanding Service SOE Southern Cross Medal SM Military Merit Medal MMM Venerable Order of Saint John KStJ Doctor of Philosophy PhD

== Ranks ==
Officers

Rank group	General / flag officers				Senior officers			Junior officers
South African Medical Service (1961–1994)
South African Medical Service (1961–1994)	General; Generaal	Lieutenant General; Luitenant-Generaal	Major General; Generaal-Majoor	Brigadier; Brigadier	Colonel; Kolonel	Commandant; Kommandant	Major; Majoor	Captain; Kaptein	Lieutenant; Luitenant	Second Lieutenant; Tweede Luitenant
