= Frans van den Berg =

Artillery Officer

Lieutenant General Frans Engerlbertus Clase van den Berg SD SM MMM
- Born: Kimberley, Cape Province
- Died: 2004; Pretoria, Gauteng
- Burial place: Ashes strewn at the Gunners Memorial, Potchefstroom
- Spouse: Elizabeth "Elsa" Helena Theresa née du Toit
- Military career
- Allegiance: South Africa; South Africa
- Branch: South African Army
- Service years: ?–1991
- Rank: Lieutenant General
- Unit: School of Artillery
- Commands: OC School of Artillery; OC North Western Command; OC Army Battle School; GOC Northern Transvaal Command; Chief of Staff Planning; General of the Gunners
- Conflicts: Border War
- Awards

Lieutenant General Frans van den Berg SD SM MMM was an artillery officer who was appointed as the first Chief of Staff Planning in the SADF in 1986.

== Early life ==
He was born in Kimberley and matriculated from Potchefstroom High School for Boys.

== Military career ==
He joined the Union Defence Force and served in the artillery. He was an instructor at the Army Gymnasium, he completed the British Long Gunnery Staff Course in 1962. Chief Instructor Gunnery at the School of Artillery & Armour. He served as Second in Command 4 Field Regiment during 1969, Second in Command School of Artillery in 1969 to 1970. Officer Commanding School of Artillery from 1970 to 1973 and simultaneously Director Artillery from 1970 to 1972, OC 81 Armoured Brigade 1973 to 1974. He was promoted to rank of brigadier in 1974. OC North Western Command 1974–1977 and simultaneously Director Artillery from 1974 to 1976, Military Advisor to Bophuthatswana from 1975 to 1977. He was tasked by the then Chief of the Army-Lt Gen Constand Viljoen to visit the Israeli Combined Arms Training Center in 1977 that led to the creation of the Army Battle School in Lohatla. Commandant Army Battle School in 1978 to 1982. OC Northern Transvaal Command 1982–1983. Much later served as Chief of Staff Planning from 1986 to 1991.

== Awards and decorations ==
- Southern Cross Decoration (SD)
- Southern Cross Medal (1952) (SM)
- Military Merit Medal (MMM)
- Pro Patria Medal
- General Service Medal (South Africa)
- Good Service Medal (Gold (30 Years))
- Good Service Medal (Silver (20 Years))
- Permanent Force Good Service Medal
- Independence Medal (Bophuthatswana)
- Order of the Cloud and Banner (3^{rd} Grade - with Yellow Grand Cordon) (ORB)

Master Gunner #1 Master Gunner badge Colonel; Frans E.C. van den Berg (Note: Post occupied when award was made: Officer Commanding School of Artillery) Year: 1970: ← #1008; Brigadier; Helm Roos / #2 → Major; A.A. Nell	General of the Gunners (Post) Black on Thatch beige, Embossed. Crossed gun barrels with grenade

== Notes ==
Military offices
New title	Chief of Staff Planning; 1986–1991	Succeeded by Lt Gen Dries van der Lith
Preceded by Maj Gen Pieter Hanekom	GOC Northern Transvaal Command; 1982–1983	Succeeded by Brig Hans Moller as OC N Tvl Comd
Preceded by Maj Gen Pieter Hanekom	GOC Northern Transvaal Command; 1982–1983	Succeeded by Maj Gen Charles Lloyd as GOC Far North Comd
Preceded by Maj Gen Pieter Hanekom	GOC Northern Transvaal Command; 1982–1983	Succeeded by Maj Gen Hans Paetzold as GOC E Tvl Comd
Preceded by Brig Constand Viljoen	Director of Artillery; 1974 – 1976	Succeeded by Col Paul Lombard
Preceded by Col Johan Potgieter	Director of Artillery; 1970 – 1972	Succeeded by Brig Constand Viljoen
Preceded by Col Shorty Brown	OC School of Artillery; 1970 – 1973	Succeeded by Col Koos Bisschoff
Preceded by Cmdt Greyvie Greyvenstein	Chief Instructor Gunnery; 1967 – 1968	Succeeded by Cmdt Paul Lombard
Honorary titles
Preceded by Col Helm Roos	Master Gunner; 1970	Succeeded by Cmdt Paul Lombard
New title	Master Gunner of the Artillery; 1982–1991	Succeeded by Maj Gen Paul Lombard
