= Helm Roos =

South African Army officer (1930–1992)

Brigadier Helm Roos
- Born: 1930
- Died: 11 May 1992; Cape Town, Cape Province
- Spouse: Jill Roos
- Relatives: Wife
- Military career
- Allegiance: South Africa
- Branch: South African Army
- Rank: Brigadier
- Nickname: "Paul"
- Unit: 4 Field Regiment
- Commands: OC 7 South African Infantry Division; Western Province Command; OC 14 Field Regiment; Chief Instructor Counter Bombardment; Chief Instructor Gunnery
- Conflicts: Operation Savannah
- Awards: Pro Patria Medal (South Africa) Good Service Medal Permanent Force Good Service Medal
- Other work: Honorary Colonel – Cape Town Rifles

Brigadier Helm Roos (1930–1992) was a senior officer in the South African Army from the artillery . He was a qualified Army Air Observation Pilot who served as OC 7 Division and Western Province Command before his retirement in the seventies.

== Early life ==
He was born in 1930 and grew up in the East Rand and matriculated from Potchefstroom High School for Boys in 1947.

== Army career ==
He joined the Defence Force in 1948 and served as an artilleryman in 4 Field Training Regiment and 14 Field Regiment. As a major, he completed the British Army Command and Staff course in 1960. Chief Instructor at the School of Artillery and Armour. Officer Commanding 14 Field Regiment at Bethlehem until 1967. Col Roos was appointed as the Military Attaché in Portugal during 1969 to 1971. Second in Command and Commander Divisional Artillery at Headquarters 7 Division. He was in command of the management team in Angola during the "Bridge 14" operation circa 1974 during the cold-war era power vacuum left by the Portuguese evacuation. OC Western Province Command. He was retained on Reserve List of Officers and served as officer in charge of National Key-points for the South African Defence Force over period 1977-1992. He was appointed as an Honorary Colonel of The Cape Town Rifles (Dukes) between 1991 and 1992.

== Awards and decorations ==
- Pro Patria Medal (South Africa) (with Cunene Clasp) (Note: Only the Cunene clasp was awarded, to members who served in Angola during Operation Savannah in 1975 and 1976. Recipients of the clasp wear a button, with the letter C encircled by a wreath, on the ribbon bar.)
- Good Service Medal (Gold (30 Years))
- Good Service Medal (Silver (20 Years))
- Permanent Force Good Service Medal
- Portuguese Knight of the Order of Aviz

Master Gunner #1008
Master Gunner badge
Brigadier; Helm Roos (Note: Grandfathered. Long Gunnery Course, Larkhill, Great Britain. Number is assigned for convenience.)
Year: Before 1970
← #1007; Brigadier; Willie Kotze	#1 → Colonel; Frans E.C. van den Berg

== Post Army career ==
He was recruited by the Royal Dutch Shell Oil company at retirement from the Army to the position of Chief of Security South Africa, where he served the remainder of his life espousing the principle of "being the harder nut to crack". He succumbed to prostate cancer in 2 Military hospital in 1992.

== Notes ==
Military offices
Preceded by Magnus Malan	OC Western Province Command; 1973–1974	Succeeded by PF van der Hooven
Preceded by Constand Viljoen	OC 14 Field Regiment; 1966–1967	Succeeded by Closed down
Honorary titles
Preceded by Brigadier Willie Kotze	Master Gunner; Before 1970	Succeeded by Colonel Frans E.C. van den Berg
