= Mimy Matimbe =

Gunner officer in South African Army

Lieutenant Colonel Mimy Eunice Matimbe psc (j)
- Born: 19 April 1977 (age 49); Mamelodi East
- Relatives: Palesa Matimbe
- Military career
- Allegiance: South Africa
- Branch: South African Army
- Service years: 2002–present
- Rank: Lieutenant Colonel
- Unit: 4 Artillery Regiment
- Commands: OC 4 Artillery Regiment: 2IC Artillery Mobilisation Regiment; Battery Commander 45 Battery
- Awards: Medalje vir Troue Diens (Medal for Loyal Service) (20 Year Clasp); Master Gunner Badge

Lt Col Mimy Matimbe is a gunner officer in the South African Army and was appointed as the first female Commanding Officer in the South African Army Artillery Formation when she took over command of 4 Artillery Regiment on 7 April 2017.

== Early life ==
Mimy Matimbe was born at Mamelodi, north east of Pretoria in 1977 and matriculated from Thabo Tsako High School in 1995. She obtained a Bachelor's degree in Commerce from Vista University, Mamelodi Campus in 1999.

== Military career ==
She completed Basic Military Training under the Voluntary Military System (VMS) at 3 SAI Bn at Kimberley, Northern Cape, in 2002 and was appointed as a Gunnery Instructor at Gunnery Wing, School of Artillery in Potchefstroom from 2005-2007 under leadership of Victor Khasapane and Ters Goedhals as Chief Instructors Gunnery. Observation Post Officer in 2008-2010 at 43 Battery, 4 Artillery Regiment. She was appointed as Battery Commander of the Target Acquisition (45) Battery two years later succeeding Capt K. Galane.

In 2014, then Maj Matimbe served as 2IC Artillery Mobilization Regiment until 31 March 2017 where she was replaced by Maj Danny Lebatla. She was promoted to the rank of lieutenant colonel in April 2017 and was appointed as the Officer Commanding, 4 Artillery Regiment on 7 April 2017. She is the first woman ever to command an artillery regular force unit in South African Military History. She was awarded the crossed-barrels by the South African Artillery Corps Council on 8 November 2019 by Brig Gen Khaya Makina during end of the year investiture celebrated at the Dan Tloome Banquet Hall, Potchefstroom. She handed over command of her regiment in late 2020 and has since completed the SANDF Joint Senior Command and Staff Programme during 2021 and served briefly as staff officer at Headquarters of Artillery and presently at the Joint Operational Headquarters.

== Honours and awards ==
=== Medals ===
- Medalje vir Troue Diens (Medal for Loyal Service) (20 Year Clasp)

Master Gunner #113
Master Gunner badge
Lt Colonel; Mimi E. Matimbe (Note: Post occupied when award was made: Officer Commanding, 4 Artillery Regiment)
Year: 2019
← #112; Lt Colonel; F.F. Kemp	#114 → Major; Gordon D. Fouché

== Notes ==
Military offices
Preceded by Jongile Maso	OC 4 Arty Regt; 2017 – 2020	Succeeded by Joe Tshabalala
Preceded by Andre de Lange	2IC Artillery Mobilisation Regiment; 2014 – 2017	Succeeded by Danny Lebatla
Honorary titles
Preceded by Frank Kemp	113th Master Gunner	Succeeded by Gordon Fouché
