= Carl Leisegang =

South African military General Officer

Brigadier Carl Sverre Leisegang DSO
- Born: 1913; Union of South Africa
- Died: 1986 (aged 72–73); Durban, Natal, South Africa
- Spouse: Hester "Hettie" Frances Stafford Harpur
- Military career
- Allegiance: South Africa
- Branch: South African Army
- Service years: – 1969
- Rank: Brigadier
- Service number: 105983V
- Unit: 1 Special Service Battalion
- Commands: 1 Special Service Battalion
- Wars: World War II
- Awards: Distinguished Service Order DSO Union Medal 1939–45 Star Africa Star Italy Star War Medal 1939–1945 Africa Service Medal (WWII)
- Other work: MOTHs Natal

Carl Sverre Leisegang DSO (1913-1986) was a senior officer in the South African Army from the artillery. He was a qualified SAAF Pilot. He served as OC Natal Command.

== Military career ==
Carl Leisegang took part in the Second World War as an Officer Commanding of the Anti Tank Regiment and 4 Field Regiment. He earned a Distinguished Service Order during that war. After the war he was appointed as Commandant School of Artillery and Armour, Officer Commanding 4 Field Regiment for the second time. He commanded Natal Command, Eastern Province & Border Command. His last tour of duty was as Military Advisor to Australia. He died in Durban in 1986.

== Awards and decorations ==
- Distinguished Service Order (DSO)
- Union Medal
- 1939–45 Star
- Africa Star
- Italy Star
- War Medal 1939–1945
- Africa Service Medal (WWII)

Master Gunner #1005
Master Gunner badge
Brigadier; Carl Sverre Leisegang (Note: Grandfathered. Long Gunnery Course, Larkhill, Great Britain. Number is assigned for convenience.)
Year: Before 1970
← #1004; Brigadier; Hendrik Jacobus 'Greyvie' Greyvenstein	#1006 → Brigadier; Jack Hawtaynee

Pilots Wings (Qualification)
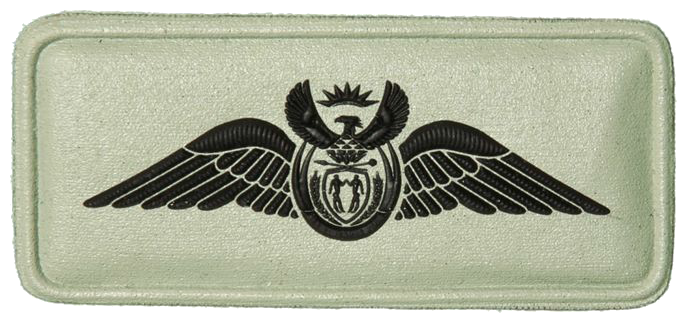
0-500 hrs. Black on Thatch beige, Embossed. National Coat of Arms with large wings

== Notes ==
Military offices
Preceded by WH Hingeston	OC Natal Command; 1955–1956	Succeeded by Petrus Jacobs
Preceded by Bob Meintjies	OC 4 Field Regiment; 1953–1955	Succeeded by Ronald McWilliam
Preceded by PE Ferguson	OC 1 Special Service Battalion; 1951–1953	Succeeded by Booysie Van der Riet
Preceded by John Gordon-Gray	OC School of Artillery and Armour; 1946–1949	Succeeded by Bull Jacobs
Preceded by John Gordon-Gray	OC 4 Field Regiment; 1942–1943	Succeeded by Frank Harpur
