= Jakes Jacobs =

South African Army Officer

Colonel Jacobus Gerhard Jacobs SM, MMM
- Born: 27 June 1951; Ventersdorp
- Military career
- Allegiance: South Africa
- Branch: South African Army
- Service years: 1970–1995
- Rank: Colonel
- Nickname: Jakes
- Unit: 14 Field Regiment
- Commands: Director of Artillery; OC School of Artillery
- Conflicts: South African Border War
- Awards: Southern Cross Medal SM Military Merit Medal MMM Pro Patria Medal (South Africa) Southern Africa Medal General Service Medal (South Africa) Unitas (Unity) Medal Good Service Medal
- Other work: Arms Industry

Col Jakes Jacobs SM, MMM was a South African Army officer from the artillery.

== Military career ==
He joined the South African Defence Force in 1970 and graduated from the South African Military Academy in 1972. He saw active service in Angola during Operation Savannah in 1975–76. Battery Commander at 14 Field Regiment, Chief Instructor Locating. He completed the Senior Command Staff Course in 1982. Chief Instructor Gunnery at School of Artillery during 1983 to 1986. He was appointed as OC School of Artillery from 1987 to 1991. He served as Director of Artillery from 1991–1995. He retired from the SANDF in 1995.

== Honours and awards ==
=== Medals ===
- Southern Cross Medal (1975) (SM)
- Military Merit Medal (MMM)
- Pro Patria Medal (South Africa) (with Cunene Clasp) (Note: Only the Cunene clasp was awarded, to members who served in Angola during Operation Savannah in 1975 and 1976. Recipients of the clasp wear a button, with the letter C encircled by a wreath, on the ribbon bar.)
- Southern Africa Medal
- General Service Medal (South Africa)
- Unitas (Unity) Medal
- Good Service Medal (Silver (20 Years))
- Good Service Medal (Bronze (10 Years))

=== Proficiency badges ===
Master Gunner #50
Master Gunner badge
Commandant; Jacobus G. 'Jakes' Jacobs (Note: Post occupied when award was made: Chief Instructor, Gunnery (CIG))
Year: 1984
← #49; Commandant; Piet D. Uys	#51 → Commandant; D.J. de Villiers

== Notes ==
Military offices
Preceded by Col Koos Laubscher	Director Artillery; 1991–1995	Succeeded by Col Maarten Schalekamp
Preceded by Col Koos Laubscher	OC School of Artillery; 1987–1991	Succeeded by Col Maarten Schalekamp
Preceded by Maj Jacob van Heerden	Chief Instructor Gunnery; 1983–1985	Succeeded by Cmdt Div de Villiers
Honorary titles
Preceded by Commandant Piet Uys	50^{th} Master Gunner; 1984	Succeeded by Commandant Div de Villiers
