= Johan Potgieter =

Brigadier Johan Diederick Potgieter SM
- Born: 14 May 1935; Bethal, Transvaal
- Died: 4 January 1976 (aged 40); Dondo, Angola
- Burial place: Bethal Cemetery
- Spouse: Sannie van der Nest
- Military career
- Branch: South African Army
- Service years: –1976
- Rank: Brigadier
- Service number: 01169895PE
- Unit: 4 Artillery Regiment
- Commands: Commandant SA Army College; Commandant SA Military Academy; Commandant School of Artillery
- Conflicts: Ops Savannah
- Awards: Southern Cross Medal SM Permanent Force Good Service Medal

Brigadier Johan Potgieter SM (14 May 1935 – 4 January 1976) was a South African Army officer from the artillery who served as OC School of Artillery, SA Military College, Director Artillery, SA Military Academy and later Orange Free State Command. He was appointed the OC 2 Military Area from late 1975 in Operation Savannah.

== Army career ==
He completed the Staff Course at the Staff College, Camberley during 1968 and served as Officer Commanding School of Artillery from 1968 – 1969, SA Army College from 1969 – 1971, Director of Artillery and SA Military Academy during 1973 – 1975. He died after being shot down during Ops Savannah in a Puma helicopter.

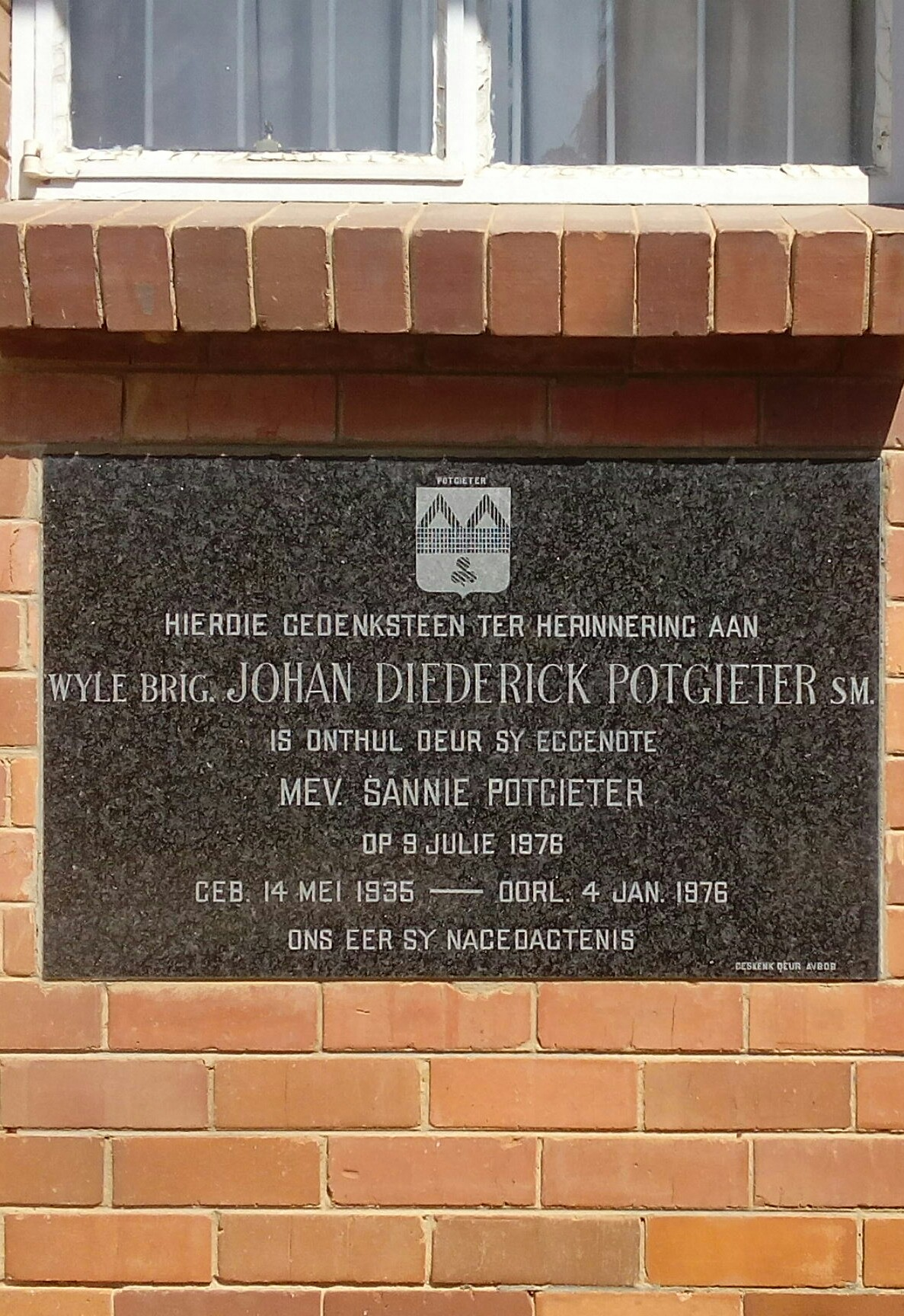
Unveiled by his wife at 2 Field Regiment, 1976

== Awards and decorations ==
- Southern Cross Medal (1952) (SM)
- Permanent Force Good Service Medal

Military offices
Preceded by Dawie Schoeman	OC 2 Military Area; 1975–1976	Succeeded by Ben de Wet Roos
Preceded by Magnus Malan	Commandant SA Military Academy; 1973–1975	Succeeded by Jan van Loggerenberg
Preceded by Constand Viljoen	Commandant SA Army College; 1969–1971	Succeeded by Mac Kotzé
Preceded by Shorty Brown	OC School of Artillery; 1968–1969	Succeeded by Shorty Brown
