= Constand =

Constand is a given name and a surname. Notable people with the name include:

== Given name ==
- Constand Viljoen (1933–2020), South African military commander and politician

== Surname ==
- Andrea Constand (born 1973), Canadian basketball player
