= Maarten Schalekamp =

Colonel Maarten Schalekamp SM, MMM
- Born: 15 April 1954 (age 72); Delmas
- Military career
- Allegiance: South Africa
- Branch: South African Army
- Service years: 1972–1998
- Rank: Colonel
- Unit: 4 Artillery Regiment
- Commands: Director of Artillery; OC School of Artillery
- Conflicts: South African Border War
- Awards: Southern Cross Medal SM Military Merit Medal MMM Pro Patria Medal Southern Africa Medal General Service Medal (South Africa) Unitas (Unity) Medal Good Service Medal

Col Maarten Schalekamp SM, MMM was an officer in the South African Army from the artillery.

== Military career ==
He joined the South African Defence Force in 1973 and graduated from the South African Military Academy in 1976 with a bachelor's degree awarded by Stellenbosch University. He saw action during the Border War in the Angolan theatre of operations with 61 Mechanised Battalion Group, 14 Field Regiment and 4 Artillery Regiment. He served as Locating Battery Commander at 4 Artillery Regiment, Chief Instructor at the School of Artillery, OC School of Artillery, OC HQ Group 30 from 1995 to 1996and finally the last Director of Artillery from 1996–1998. He retired from the SANDF in 1998.

== Honours and awards ==
=== Medals ===
- Southern Cross Medal (1975) (SM)
- Military Merit Medal (MMM)
- Pro Patria Medal
- Southern Africa Medal
- General Service Medal (South Africa)
- Unitas (Unity) Medal
- Good Service Medal (Silver (20 Years))
- Good Service Medal (Bronze (10 Years))

=== Proficiency badges ===
Master Gunner #71
Master Gunner badge
Colonel; Maarten A. Schalekamp (Note: Post occupied when award was made: Director Artillery)
Year: 1996
← #67; Captain; J. Daniel A. Crafford	#72 → Brigadier General; Chris H. Roux

== Notes ==
Military offices
Preceded by Col Jakes Jacobs	Director Artillery; 1996–1998	Succeeded by Brig Gen Chris Roux as GOC Artillery Formation
Preceded by Col Jakes Jacobs	OC School of Artillery; 1991–1995	Succeeded by Col Theuns Coetzee
Preceded by Lt Col Johann Potgieter	OC 14 Artillery Regiment; 1986–1987	Succeeded by Lt Col George Swanepoel
Honorary titles
Unknown	71^{st} Master Gunner; 1996	Succeeded by Brig Gen Chris Roux
