= Steve Biko Artillery Regiment =

Airborne regiment of the South African Artillery

18 Light Regiment Steve Biko Artillery Regiment
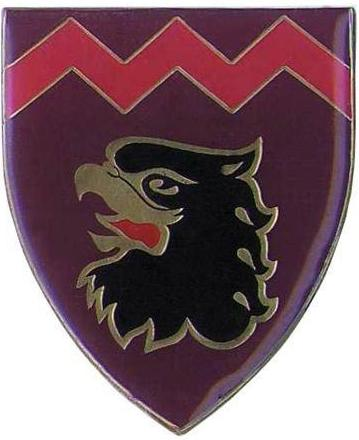
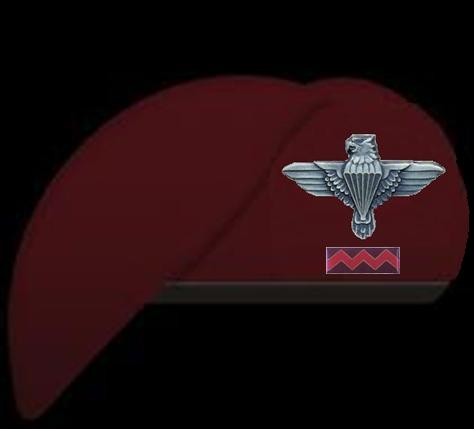
- Active: January 1977 to Present
- Country: South Africa
- Allegiance: Republic of South Africa; Republic of South Africa
- Branch: South African Army; South African Army
- Type: Airborne Artillery
- Size: Regiment
- Part of: South African Army Artillery Formation; Army Conventional Reserve
- Motto(s): Primus Inter Pares (First Among Equals)
- Equipment: 120 millimetres (4.7 in) Mortars
- Abbreviation: SBAR

The Steve Biko Artillery Regiment (formerly 18 Light Regiment) is an airborne artillery regiment of the South African Artillery.

== First Call Up (Camp): 1978 ==
Took place 13 November to 8 December 1978 at the Army Battle School at Lohatla. At the time the unit consisted of one Battery and a Regimental Headquarters. The regiment's initial intake consisted of the Operation Savannah veterans of 141 Battery of 14 Field Regiment and 41 Battery of 4 Field Regiment. None of the troops allocated to the unit were parachute qualified.

During 1979 the regiment secured the recruitment of a Signals Officer and a Regimental Sergeant Major.

The regiment was better positioned for its second training camp ‘Exercise Blinkspies 2’ (Shining Spear 2) which was held from 25 October 1979 to 24 November 1979. The Chief of the Army, Lieutenant General Constand Viljoen, visited the unit during this exercise.

== Expansion of the regiment: 1980 ==
1980 saw the take on of new members from the training units. The regiment at this stage consisted of 181 Battery and one troop (half a battery – equivalent of four mortars) from 182 Battery.

Nine new candidate officers emerged from the efforts of training programmes initiated in 1978 and as a result leadership shortages were addressed.

The first batch of parachute qualified gunners also transferred to the regiment in December 1980.

== Incorporation into 44 Parachute Brigade: 1981–1982 ==
On 25 May 1981 Colonel Jan Breytenbach, then the Officer Commanding of 44 Parachute Brigade, visited the regiment and the future Airborne strategy and role of 18 Light Regiment was highlighted as support to the newly formed 44 Parachute Brigade, with Artillery Firepower during Airborne Operations, or any other Operations of the Brigade.

In June 1982 the regiment was incorporated into the newly formed 44 Parachute Brigade and its new base, Murray Hill. Attempts were made at the time by the Brigade to change the regiment's name to 44 Light Regiment, but the original name was supported by the then Chief of Army.

18 Light Regiment was structured slightly different from the other conventional medium artillery regiments. The regiment consisted of a small RHQ element and 3 Batteries, namely 181, 182 and 183 Battery. Each battery consisted of two troops, each with four 120 millimetres (4.7 in) mortars. Each mortar detachment consisted of five gunners.

The 120 millimetres (4.7 in) mortars of the regiment gave it an ideal airborne capacity and ability to be deployed as a true light artillery regiment. Colonel Frank Bestbier, the successor to Col Jan Breytenbach, wasted no time in integrating the gunners into their new airborne role, referring to this regiment as My Gunners.

In order to fulfill its airborne objective, it was decided that the regiment would only consist of gunners that had qualified as paratroopers. The existing Officers and men of the unit who were not yet qualified took this as a challenge, and in March 1982 the leader element was sent to 1 Parachute Regiment in Bloemfontein for parachute training.

The regiments' traditional blue artillery berets were now exchanged for the maroon paratrooper berets, with new airborne terminology becoming part of the gunners' lingo.

== Exercises ==
=== Exercise “Ubique”: 1982 ===
In November 1982, 181 Battery made its first airborne deployment to the General Piet Joubert Training Area. The jump included a 120 mm (4.7 in) mortar drop with full ammunition and equipment.

On 11 December 1984 the regiment deployed all three batteries in a single airborne drop as a part of Exercise “Ubique”. The mortars, equipment and ammunition were carried and dropped by three C-130 Hercules aircraft and a total of 200 gunners, NCOs and officers followed in three C160 troop carriers.

It was recorded by the military media at the time that the drop was recorded between 800–950 feet (240–290 m) and took approximately 50 seconds for all equipment and men to be on the ground. With chutes stored, the men deployed to their firing position within minutes and commenced fire on a target that was successfully and completely destroyed. These three batteries were also airlifted and deployed later by helicopter as a part of the same exercise.

The vision of the 1970s to have an airborne artillery regiment was attained, and now the regiment could truly claim to be the only airborne artillery regiment in Africa.

=== Exercise Iron Eagle 1: 1987 ===
On 25 May 1987 the regiment participated along with rest of the brigade in one of the largest peacetime drop of paratroopers at the time.

This exercise was of great importance to the regiment as it saw the debut of the regiment's answer to its transportation problem. Once on the ground the batteries were hampered by a lack of mobility. The moving of tons of ammunition and equipment became a major logistical concern. To solve this problem 44 Parachute Brigade developed the "Jakkals" (A small “jeep like” vehicle) with mountable .50 BMG or 7.65mm MAG and trailer that could be dropped by parachute.

=== Exercise “Strandloper” (Beachcomber): 1988 ===
From July to September 1988, 181 Battery participated as part of the then 14 Parachute Battalion Group in an amphibian exercise held in Walvis Bay, South West Africa (Namibia)

The exercise consisted of SAS Tafelberg, a replenishment ship from the South African Navy, and six other naval attack crafts. As a part of the training leading up to the exercise Paratroopers received amphibian orientation with the Navy and Marines.

Amongst others the objective of the exercise was to establish a beach head from where an attack could be launched and 181 Battery commanding officer directed naval gun fire (NGF) on a target area. 181 Battery also delivered accurate firepower on a target at H-Hour.

== Operations ==
=== Operational Duties: 1988–1990 ===
In March 1988, 182 Battery under the Command of Captain Johan Borret participated in the 3rd attack on Quito Cuanavale during Operation Hooper and Operation Packer. Deployed in a primary role as Artillery and tasked with engaging targets on the West Bank of the Tumbo River it came under return fire by FAPLA within the first hour and on and off during the remainder of the attack. During this operation two gunners were wounded.

During 1989, 183 Battery exchanged their maroon paratroopers’ berets for the light blue berets of the UN peace keeping force. The battery, commanded by Captain Andre Pelser formed part of the Joint Military Monitoring Group (J.M.M.C) to assist in the overseeing of the withdrawal of the S.A.D.F. from Namibia and the Cubans from Angola.

1989 also saw the last Citizen Force camp of 60 days and the deployment of 182 Battery in direct formation with 3 Parachute Battalion. 182 Battery was tasked with Border Patrol duties along the Limpopo River. (South Africa, Zimbabwe and Botswana) Based at Almond Base in the Weipe District.

A handful of Parachute Qualified Gunners from 182 Battery elected to be assigned to 3 Parachute Battalion in Sector 10, South West Africa (S.W.A.) in December 1989 and January 1990. Here they served in an infantry capacity patrolling the area of Northern S.W.A. and also on Fire-force Standby. This all before the withdrawal of the S.A.D.F. from Angola and South West Africa in the first quarter of 1990.

=== Urban and rural COINOPS: 1984–1991 ===
As with the rest of the Brigade each individual unit were also deployed for internal unrest operations. 181 Battery were deployed at Kirkwood in the Eastern Cape. It served a dual stabilization role as well as efforts to improve the conditions of the local community. For its efforts 181 Battery was awarded with the Chief of Army Merit Certificate for Exceptional Duty.

In September 1985 181 Battery were deployed for border patrol duties at Madimbo on the Zimbabwe Border. No incidents of insurgency were recorded however the occasional attempt at illegal border crossings was prevented.

During 1987 the entire 18 Light Regiment was called up to maintain law and order at Mamelodi, East of Pretoria, Mthombo in Port Elizabeth and Kwaggafontein which is East of Mafeking.

=== Scaling-Down and its impacts on 18 Light Regiment ===
1991 was a year of many changes for 18 Light Regiment, with the movement of 44 Parachute Brigade Headquarters to Bloemfontein its own Headquarters moved from Murray Hill to the Paulshof Building in Pretoria. Due to other commitments the leadership group at the time also underwent changes and with the creation of the SANDF in 1994 the Brigade was scheduled for a planned downscale to that of a Regiment. With this 18 Light Regiment was transferred soon thereafter to the Artillery Formation in Pretoria and was located at Magazine Hill, with TSA as its neighbour.

== Name Change ==
In August 2019, 52 Reserve Force units had their names changed to reflect the diverse military history of South Africa. 18 Light Regiment became the Steve Biko Artillery Regiment, and have 3 years to design and implement new regimental insignia.

The current honorific is a remembrance of anti-Apartheid activist Steve Biko, the father of the 1960s to 1970s grassroots Black Consciousness Movement and co-founder of the South African Students' Organisation.

=== Regimental coat of arms ===
The regimental coat of arms was designed by George Gravette and with the motto "Primus Inter Pares" (First Amongst Equals) is an emblem to be proud of. The regimental coat of arms depicts the well-known griffon of 44 Parachute Brigade with adaptions to distinguish artillery from infantry and other members of 44 Parachute Brigade. All shoulder flashes of 44 Parachute Brigade have the same griffon; however, 18 Light Regiment had the artillery ‘lightning bolt’ which runs horizontally just above the griffon.

As with all in 44 Parachute Brigade, Steve Biko Artillery Regiment paratroopers also wore the coveted maroon paratrooper beret with an iron spread-eagled griffon and the artillery beret bar (balkie) below the metal griffon which also had a ‘lightning bolt’.

== Command structure ==
Honorary Colonel	Period
Colonel G. C. Oliver	1977-11-15 to 1981-05-07

Regimental commanding officer	Period
Colonel G. C. Oliver	1977-11-15 to 1981-05-07
Lieutenant Colonel Johan Cloete	1981-05-07 to 1990-01-31
Lieutenant Colonel Bernie Pols	1990-02-01 to 1991
Captain G J Jarman	1991 to 1994
Major R Nell	1994 to 1996
Major Eddie Hanekom	1996 to 2002
Major Jimmy Weir-Smith	2002 to 2003
Major Jacques Viljoen	2003 to 2004
Major S Clark	2005 to Present
