= Paul Lombard (general) =

Major General Paul Lombard SM MMM
- Born: Klerksdorp
- Military career
- Allegiance: South Africa; South Africa
- Branch: South African Army
- Service years: –1993
- Rank: Major General
- Unit: School of Artillery
- Commands: OC School of Artillery; OC Southern Cape Command; Chief of Army Staff Planning; General of the Artillery
- Conflicts: South African Border War
- Awards: Southern Cross Medal SM Military Merit Medal MMM Pro Patria Medal (South Africa) Southern Africa Medal General Service Medal (South Africa) Good Service Medal Permanent Force Good Service Medal

Major General Paul Lombard SM MMM was an artillery officer who completed the British Army Staff Course during 1967. He qualified as an Army Air Observation Pilot at the Central Flying School SAAF in Dunnottar. He served as the Chief of Army Staff Planning (GS6) in the South African Defence Force from 1991.

== Military career ==
He served as pilot at 42 Squadron SAAF, Gunnery Instructor at the School of Artillery and Armour. Maj Lombard was appointed as the Chief Instructor Gunnery in 1969. Second in Command South African Army College in 1971. Military Attaché to Mozambique until 1975.Officer Commanding School of Artillery from 1976 to 1980 and simultaneously Director Artillery. Staff officer at 7 Division. As a brigadier, he did a stint as the Officer Commanding Southern Cape Command at George during the 1982-1984. Chief of Army Staff Planning and General of the Artillery from 1991 to 1993.

== Awards and decorations ==
- Southern Cross Medal (1975) (SM)
- Military Merit Medal (MMM)
- Pro Patria Medal (South Africa) (with Cunene Clasp) (Note: Only the Cunene clasp was awarded, to members who served in Angola during Operation Savannah in 1975 and 1976. Recipients of the clasp wear a button, with the letter C encircled by a wreath, on the ribbon bar.)
- Southern Africa Medal
- General Service Medal (South Africa)
- Good Service Medal (Gold (30 Years))
- Good Service Medal (Silver (20 Years))
- Permanent Force Good Service Medal

Master Gunner #4 Master Gunner badge Commandant; Paul M. Lombard (Note: Post occupied when award was made: Officer Commanding School of Artillery) Year: 1970: ← #3; Commandant; P.J. van der Walt / #5 → Major; Charles F. 'Willie' Wentzel	General of the Gunners (Post) Black on Thatch beige, Embossed. Crossed gun barrels with grenade

== Notes ==
Military offices
Unknown	Chief of Army Staff Planning; 1991–1992	Succeeded by Maj Gen Tinus de Jager
Preceded by Brig Frans vd Berg	Director of Artillery; 1976–1980	Succeeded by Col Gert Potgieter
Preceded by Col Koos Bisschoff	OC School of Artillery; 1976–1980	Succeeded by Col "Splitpin" Wentzel
Preceded by Maj Frans vd Berg	Chief Instructor Gunnery; 1969–1970	Succeeded by Maj Joffel vd Westhuizen
Honorary titles
Preceded by Lt Gen Frans vd Berg	General of the Artillery; 1991–1993	Succeeded by Maj Gen Phil du Preez
Preceded by Col Frans vd Berg	4^{th} Master Gunner; 1970	Succeeded by Maj Delville Linford
