= Theuns Coetzee =

South African Soldier

Colonel Theuns J. Coetzee HC MMM
- Born: Pretoria
- Military career
- Allegiance: South Africa
- Branch: South African Army
- Service years: 1976–1998
- Rank: Colonel
- Unit: 4 Artillery Regiment
- Commands: OC School of Artillery
- Wars: South African Border War
- Awards: Honoris Crux (1975) HC Military Merit Medal MMM Pro Patria Medal Southern Africa Medal General Service Medal (South Africa) Unitas (Unity) Medal Good Service Medal

Col Theuns Coetzee HC MMM is a South African Army officer from the artillery who was decorated for valour.

== Military career ==
He joined the South African Defence Force in 1976 as a conscript and qualified as a military parachutist. Battery Commander of 141 Battery at 14 Field Regiment. He saw action in Angola during the South African Border War as a result of which he was awarded the Honoris Crux for actions of bravery and being wounded in operations deep inside Angola during 1985. He served as Chief Instructor Gunnery at the School of Artillery from 1988–1990. He passed the Army College course in 1991. He served as second-in-command of the School of Artillery and then was appointed as the Commanding Officer during 1995–1998. He resigned from the SANDF in 1998.

== Honours and awards ==
=== Medals ===
- Honoris Crux (1975) (HC)
- Military Merit Medal (MMM)
- Pro Patria Medal
- Southern Africa Medal
- General Service Medal (South Africa)
- Unitas (Unity) Medal
- Good Service Medal (Silver (20 Years))
- Good Service Medal (Bronze (10 Years))

=== Proficiency badges ===
Proficiency badges
Master Gunner #61 Master Gunner badge Commandant; Theuns J. Coetzee (Note: Post occupied when award was made: Chief Instructor, Gunnery (CIG)) Year: 1990: ← #60; Commandant; F.J.G. van Eeden / #62 → Commandant; J.W. 'Jackie' Potgieter	Paratrooper Basic (Qualification) Basic, Static Line. Black on Thatch beige, Embossed. Small Black wings

== Notes ==
Military offices
Preceded by Col Maarten Schalekamp	OC School of Artillery; 1995–1998	Succeeded by Col Perie Franken
