= Jongile Maso =

South African military officer (born 1966)

Brigadier General Jongile Maso
- Born: c. 1966; Queenstown, Eastern Cape
- Military career
- Allegiance: South Africa
- Branch: South African Army
- Service years: 1990–present
- Rank: Brigadier General
- Unit: 4 Artillery Regiment
- Commands: GOC Artillery Formation; OC DOD Mobilisation Centre; OC 4 Artillery Regiment; OC Artillery Mobilisation Regiment; Battery Commander 44 Battery
- Awards: General Service Medal (South Africa) Tshumelo Ikatelaho (General Service Medal) Unitas (Unity) Medal Medalje vir Troue Diens (Medal for Loyal Service) Good Service Medal

Brig Gen Jongile Maso is an artillery general officer in the South African Army who served as Commanding Officer 4 Artillery Regiment during 2014–2016. He previously served as the Commander of the DOD Mobilisation Centre from 2017-2021.

== Early life ==
Maso was born in Queenstown and grew up in Mdantsane, East London where he matriculated. He joined the uMkhonto we Sizwe and was trained in Uganda.

== Military career ==
He served as Officer Instructor at the School of Artillery from 2001. Observation Post Officer, Battery Reconnaissance Officer, Battery Post Officer and Battery Commander at the 155mm GV-5 Battery (Sierra) from 2002 to 2009 at 4 Artillery Regiment.

2IC Artillery Mobilization Regiment and later regimental commander at the same unit. He completed the Senior Command and Staff Course in 2013. Officer Commanding 4 Artillery Regiment on 1 March 2014 until 31 Dec 2016. He was awarded the crossed-barrels by Brig Gen Khaya Makina in 2017.He is appointed as the General Officer Commanding South African Army Artillery Formation with effect from 1 November 2021.

== Honours and awards ==
=== Medals ===
- General Service Medal (South Africa)
- Tshumelo Ikatelaho (General Service Medal)
- Unitas (Unity) Medal
- Medalje vir Troue Diens (Medal for Loyal Service) (20 Year Clasp)
- Good Service Medal (Bronze (10 Years))

Master Gunner #103
Master Gunner badge
Colonel; Jongile G. Maso (Note: Post occupied when award was made: Officer Commanding, Department of Defence, Mobilisation Center)
Year: 2017
← #102; Brigadier General; Khaya Makina	#104 → Lt Col; W.M. 'Buks' Botha

== Notes ==
Military offices
Preceded by Khaya Makina	GOC SA Army Artillery Formation; 2021 –	Succeeded by Incumbent
Preceded by Matloki Misapitso	OC 4 Arty Regt; 2014 – 2016	Succeeded by Mimy Matimbe
Preceded by Riaan Marx	OC Artillery Mobilisation Regiment; 2010 – 2014	Succeeded by Andre de Lange
Honorary titles
Preceded by Khaya Makina	103rd Master Gunner	Succeeded by Buks Botha
