= Hendrik Greyvenstein =

South African Army officer (1916–1986)

Brigadier Hendrik J. Greyvenstein SM
- Born: Hendrik Jacobus Greyvenstein; 11 July 1916; Pretoria, South Africa
- Died: 15 March 1986 (aged 69); Pretoria, South Africa
- Spouse: Eileen Dulcie de Vaal (1922–2007)
- Relatives: June Barbara Greyvenstein (daughter); Rose Williams (daughter); Jan Michael Greyvenstein (son)
- Military career
- Allegiance: South Africa South Africa
- Branch: South African Army
- Rank: Brigadier
- Nickname: Greyvie
- Unit: School of Artillery
- Commands: Director Artillery; OC School of Artillery; OC 4 Field Regiment
- Conflicts: World War II
- Awards: Southern Cross Medal SM Union Medal 1939–45 Star Africa Star War Medal 1939–1945 Africa Service Medal (WWII)
- Other work: Farmer

Brigadier Hendrik Jacobus Greyvenstein SM (July 11, 1916 – March 15, 1986) was a senior officer in the South African Army from the artillery. He was educated at the University of Pretoria and took part in the Second World War as an artilleryman. In 1944, he was seconded to the Royal Artillery and served as an Adjutant at the Artillery School, officer instructor, and Battery Commander of the 10 Field Battery, 4 Field Regiment.

== Military career ==
Greyvenstein graduated from the British Overseas School in Egypt during the Second World War and completed the SA Military College Staff course. He served as Chief Instructor Gunnery during the fifties, Battery Commander at 1 South African Infantry Battalion in Oudtshoorn. He commanded 4 Field Regiment and the School of Artillery. before being appointed as the Director of Artillery. Brigadier Greyvenstein served at General Headquarters, Chief of Staff section before he retired in the mid seventies.

Greyvenstein died in Pretoria on 15 March 1986, at the age of 69.

== Awards and decorations ==
- Southern Cross Medal (1952) (SM)
- Union Medal
- 1939–45 Star
- Africa Star
- War Medal 1939–1945
- Africa Service Medal (WWII)

Master Gunner #1004
Master Gunner badge
Brigadier; Hendrik Jacobus 'Greyvie' Greyvenstein (Note: Grandfathered. Long Gunnery Course, Larkhill, Great Britain. Number is assigned for convenience.)
Year: Before 1970
← #1003; Major General; Bob Meintjies	#1005 → Brigadier; Carl Sverre Leisegang

== Notes ==
Military offices
Preceded by Established	Director Artillery; 1964–1966	Succeeded by Constand Viljoen
Preceded by Phillip Stanley Ince Jay	Commandant School of Artillery & Armour; 1963–1966	Succeeded by Constand Viljoen
Preceded by Ronald McWilliam	OC 4 Field Regiment; 1962–1963	Succeeded by Jack Hawtayne
Preceded by Charles Brereton-Stiles	Chief Instructor Gunnery; 1952–1955	Succeeded by John Gordon-Gray
