= School of Artillery =

The School of Artillery is an army artillery training establishment in several Commonwealth armies.

- School of Artillery (Australia)
- School of Artillery (Indian Army) - see Regiment of Artillery (India)
- School of Artillery (New Zealand)
- School of Artillery (Pakistan)
- School of Artillery (Sri Lanka)
- School of Artillery (South Africa)

== See also ==
- Royal School of Artillery
