= Dawid Schoonwinkel =

Colonel Dawid Benjamin Johannes Schoonwinkel
- Born: 1 March 1960 (age 66); Bloemfontein
- Military career
- Allegiance: South Africa
- Branch: South African Army
- Service years: 1979–2020
- Rank: Colonel
- Nickname: DBJ
- Service number: 77???????
- Unit: 4 Artillery Regiment
- Commands: SSO Research & Development, Artillery; OC School of Artillery; OC 4 Artillery Regiment; SO1 Force Preparation, 4 Artillery Regiment
- Conflicts: South African Border War
- Awards: Pro Patria Medal Southern Africa Medal General Service Medal (South Africa) Unitas (Unity) Medal Medalje vir Troue Diens (Medal for Loyal Service) Good Service Medal

Col Dawid Schoonwinkel was an artillery officer in the South African Army.

== Military career ==
He joined the SADF in 1979 at 4 Field Regiment and completed the national service. He was appointed as an instructor at the School of Arty. He saw action in various roles during the Border War in Angola with 14 and 4 Artillery Regiments. He served as Battery Commander, Officer Commanding 4 Artillery Regiment, Second in Command School of Artillery from 1999-2006, SSO Research & Development 2006-2008 and OC School of Artillery in 2008 until his retirement in 2020.

== Honours and awards ==
=== Medals ===
- Pro Patria Medal
- Southern Africa Medal
- General Service Medal (South Africa)
- Unitas (Unity) Medal
- Medalje vir Troue Diens (Medal for Loyal Service) (30 Year Clasp)
- Good Service Medal (Silver (20 Years))
- Good Service Medal (Bronze (10 Years))

=== Proficiency badges ===
Master Gunner #83
Master Gunner badge
Lt Colonel; Dawid B.J. Schoonwinkel (Note: Post occupied when award was made: 2IC, School of Artillery)
Year: 2002
← #82; Lt Colonel; J.J. Jacobs	#84 → Lt Colonel; André J. Claassen

== Notes ==
Military offices
Preceded by Col Thulani Zungu	OC School of Artillery; 2008–2020	Succeeded by Col Tiger Johnson
Preceded by Col Sarel Kruger	SSO R&D; 2006 – 2008	Succeeded by Col Khaya Makina
Preceded by Lt Col Phillip van Dyk	Second in Command School of Artillery; 1999–2006	Succeeded by Lt Col Tiaan Steyn
Honorary titles
Preceded by Lt Col Jurie Jacobs	83^{rd} Master Gunner; 2002	Succeeded by Lt Col Andre Claassen
