= Shorty Brown =

South African Artillery Officer

Colonel Richard Frederick Brown SM MMM
- Born: Richard Frederick Brown; 15 November 1930; Middelburg, Transvaal
- Military career
- Allegiance: South Africa; South Africa
- Branch: South African Army
- Service years: 1950–1985
- Rank: Colonel
- Nickname: Shorty
- Unit: School of Artillery
- Commands: Twice OC School of Artillery; OC 4 Artillery Regiment
- Awards: Southern Cross Medal SM Military Merit Medal MMM Good Service Medal
- Other work: Estate agent

Colonel Richard Frederick "Shorty" Brown SM MMM (born 15 November 1930) was an artillery officer who commanded the South African Artillery, School of Artillery (two separate occasions) and 4 Field Regiment

== Military career ==
Brown joined the Union Defence Force in 1950. He later served as the Battery Commander of 43 Battery at 2 SA Infantry Battalion Group, Officer Commanding 4 Field Regiment, Officer Commanding School of Artillery at two different instances and later Director Artillery (double hat appointments) before Brigadier J.J. Stapelberg took over the latter role in early 1970. Col Brown also served as a staff officer at the SADF Headquarters, Army Headquarters, 8 Division and North Western Command at Potchefstroom before retirement in 1985.

== Awards and decorations ==
- Southern Cross Medal (1975) (SM)
- Military Merit Medal (MMM)
- Good Service Medal (Gold (30 Years))
- Good Service Medal (Silver (20 Years))
- Good Service Medal (Bronze (10 Years))

Military offices
Preceded by Constand Viljoen	Director Artillery; 1969–1970	Succeeded by Boet Stapelberg
Preceded by Johan Potgieter	OC School of Artillery; 1969–1970	Succeeded by Frans van den Berg
Preceded by Jack Hawtayne	OC 4 Field Regiment; 1968–1969	Succeeded by Piet van der Walt
Preceded by Constand Viljoen	OC School of Artillery; 1966–1968	Succeeded by Johan Potgieter
