= Abe Notshweleka =

South African Army officer (1954–2021)

Major General Mandla Robert Notshweleka
- Born: July 1954; Kempton Park
- Died: 2021 (aged 66–67); 1 Military Hospital, Pretoria
- Military career
- Allegiance: South Africa
- Branch: South African Army
- Service years: 197?–2021
- Rank: Major General
- Nickname: Abe Sishuba
- Unit: South African Army Artillery Formation
- Commands: Chief Director Defence Acquisitions; GOC Artillery Formation; COS Artillery Formation
- Awards: Merit Medal MMS Merit Medal MMB Operational Medal for Southern Africa South Africa Service Medal Tshumelo Ikatelaho (General Service Medal) Unitas (Unity) Medal Medalje vir Troue Diens (Medal for Loyal Service) Good Service Medal Service Medal
- Other work: Special Advisor to Minister of Safety and Security; Chairman of the Non-Statutory Forces Task Team, Minister of Police

Maj Gen Abe Notshweleka was a General Officer in the South African Army from the artillery. He was born in 1954 in Kempton Park and grew up in Tembisa where he matriculated. He joined the uMkhonto we Sizwe's underground structures. He completed a Teaching diploma from a College of Education in Bophuthatswana and taught in schools around Mafikeng. He went into exile through Botswana and later in Malanje, Angola where he completed military training. He later served as a MK Camp Commander of Malanje. He stayed in Mozambique and in Tanzania where he was a Military Attaché.

== Military career ==
He specialized in artillery while in exile and integrated into the South African National Defence Force with the rank of a lieutenant colonel on 27 April 1994.

He completed the bridging training at the School of Artillery in Klipdrift. He served as a staff officer at 4 Artillery Regiment and the Directorate of Artillery in the office of the Chief of the Army from 1995 to 1998. Lt. Col. Notshweleka completed the Senior Command and Staff Duties Course in 1999 and Executive National Security Program in 2001.

He was appointed the first Chief of Staff of the newly established Artillery Type Formation from 1999 to 2001. He was promoted to the rank of brigadier general on 1 October 2001 and was General Officer Commanding Artillery Formation from 2001 to 2010. He was appointed at the CD Defence Acquisition at the Defence Secretariat from 2010 until he retired with pension in July 2014. He served as a Special Advisor to Minister of Police (Minister Bheki Cele) in his civilian life. He died at 1 Military Hospital, Thaba Tshwane in 2021.

== Honours and awards ==
=== Medals ===
- Merit Medal (Silver) (MMS)
- Merit Medal (Bronze) (MMB)
- Operational Medal for Southern Africa
- South Africa Service Medal
- Tshumelo Ikatelaho (General Service Medal)
- Unitas (Unity) Medal
- Medalje vir Troue Diens (Medal for Loyal Service) (30 Year Clasp)
- Good Service Medal (Silver (20 Years))
- Service Medal (Bronze)

=== Identification badges ===
Master Gunner #79
Master Gunner badge
Brigadier General; M.R. 'Abe' Notshweleka (Note: Post occupied when award was made: General Officer Commanding, Artillery Formation)
Year: 2002
| ← #78; Colonel; Niek J. du Plessis | #80 → Lt Colonel; Andre S. de Jager |

== Notes ==
Military offices
| Preceded by Maj Gen Otto Schür | Chief Director Acquisition Management; 2010 – 2014 | Succeeded by Maj Gen Jabu Mbuli |
| Preceded by Brig Gen Chris Roux | General Officer Commanding Artillery Formation; 2001 – 2010 | Vacant Title next held by Brig Gen Deon Holtzhausen in 2012 |
| Preceded by Col Carel Laubscher as acting | Chief of Staff Artillery Formation; 1999 – 2001 | Succeeded by Col Perie Franken |
Honorary titles
| Preceded by Col Niek du Plessis | 79th Master Gunner; 2001 | Succeeded by Lt Col Andre de Jager |
