= Roy Andersen (general) =

South African businessman and military general officer

Major General Roy Cecil Andersen CSSA SD & Bar SM MMM JCD with 30 Yr Clasp
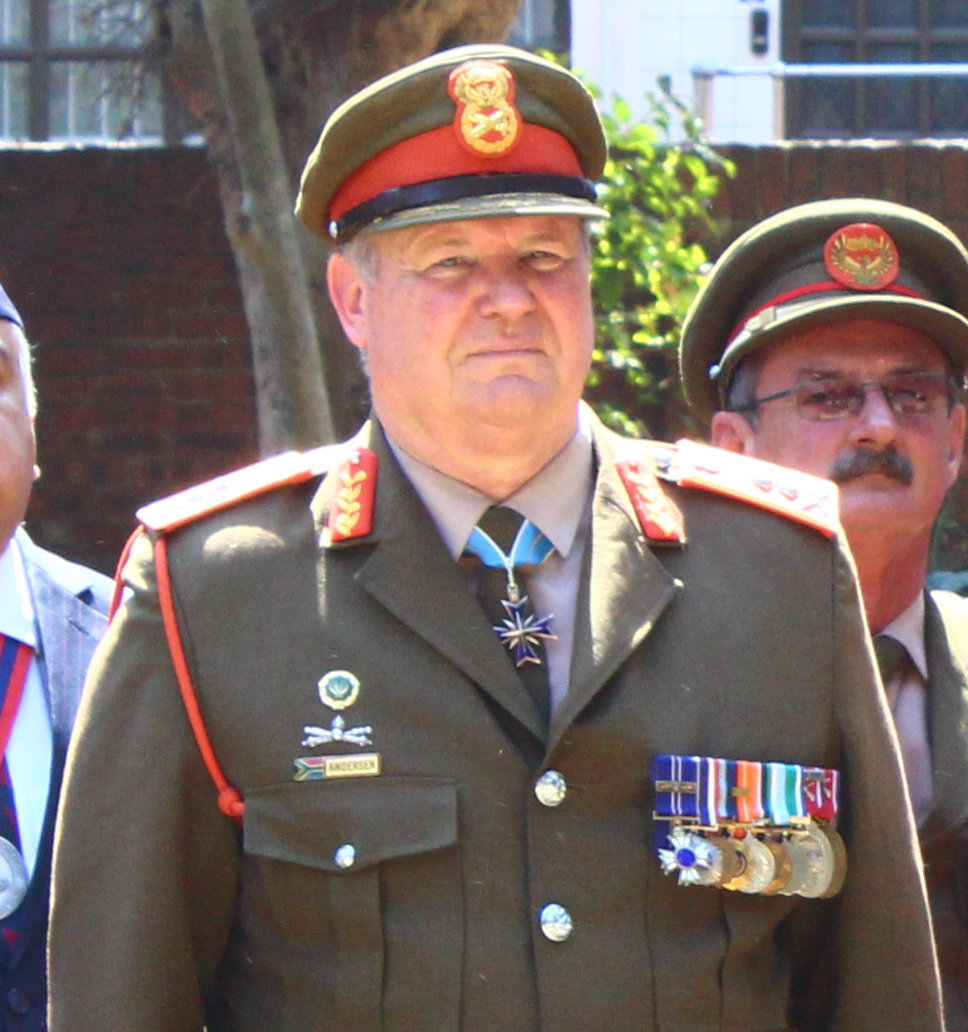
- Maj Gen Roy C Andersen Chief Defence Reserves SANDF
- Born: 12 May 1948 (age 78); Johannesburg, Transvaal, Union of South Africa
- Military career
- Allegiance: South Africa
- Branch: South African Army
- Service years: 1966–2021
- Rank: Major General
- Unit: Transvaal Horse Artillery
- Commands: General of the Gunners; Chief Defence Reserves; Director Part Time Component; SSO Operations, 7 Div; SSO Artillery, 7 Div; OC Transvaal Horse Artillery
- Conflicts: South African Border War
- Awards: Star of South Africa CSSA Southern Cross Decoration SD & Bar Southern Cross Medal SM Military Merit Medal MMM Pro Patria Medal (South Africa) General Service Medal (South Africa) Unitas (Unity) Medal Mandela Commemoration Medal Medalje vir Troue Diens (Medal for Loyal Service) John Chard Decoration JCD John Chard Medal
- Other work: Businessman

Major General Roy Cecil Andersen CSSA SD & Bar SM MMM JCD with 30 Yr Clasp (born 12 May 1948 in Johannesburg) is a South African businessman and a retired Reserve general officer in the South African Army from the artillery. He matriculated from Northview High School and graduated from Witwatersrand University.

== Military career ==
He was commissioned into the Artillery in 1966 at 14 Field Regiment in Bethlehem, Orange Free State where he served under the then Officer Commanding- Cmdt C.L. Viljoen. He commanded the Transvaal Horse Artillery from 1976 to 1979 and participated in Operation Savannah both as regimental Commander and Air Observation Post Officer. He was thereafter appointed as Senior Staff Officer Artillery and subsequently Senior Staff Officer Operations of 7 South African Infantry Division. He was promoted to the rank of Major General in October 2003, as Chief Defence Reserves for the South African National Defence Force.

== Civilian career ==
He studied at the University of the Witwatersrand, qualifying as a Chartered Accountant (SA) in 1972 and as a Certified Public Accountant in 1975 in Texas.

He served as Executive President of the Johannesburg Stock Exchange from 1992 until 1997. As of 2023 he is a Director of Nampak.

== Honours and awards ==
=== Medals ===
He has been awarded the

- Star of South Africa (Commander) (CSSA)
- Southern Cross Decoration (SD & Bar)
- Southern Cross Medal (1975) (SM)
- Military Merit Medal (MMM)
- Pro Patria Medal (South Africa) (with Cunene Clasp) (Note: Only the Cunene clasp was awarded, to members who served in Angola during Operation Savannah in 1975 and 1976. Recipients of the clasp wear a button, with the letter C encircled by a wreath, on the ribbon bar.)
- General Service Medal (South Africa)
- Unitas (Unity) Medal
- Mandela Commemoration Medal (Gold)
- Medalje vir Troue Diens (Medal for Loyal Service) (50 Year Clasp)
- Medalje vir Troue Diens (Medal for Loyal Service) (40 Year Clasp)
- John Chard Decoration (with 30 year clasp) (JCD)
- John Chard Medal

=== Proficiency badges ===
Proficiency badges
Master Gunner #110 Master Gunner badge Major General; Roy C. Andersen (Note: Post occupied when award was made: CD SANDF Reserves, CSD) Year: 2019: ← #109; Master Warrant Officer; M.P. Mokoena / #111 → Lt Colonel; M.S. Makhele	Badge for Voluntary Reserve Force Service (Service Award) Five Years Voluntary Service. Black on Thatch beige, Embossed.

== Notes ==
Honorary titles
Preceded by Maj Gen Koos Laubscher	General of the Gunners; 1 December 2005–12 May 2015	Vacant Title next held by Lt Gen Jabu Mbuli in 2017
Military offices
Preceded by Maj Gen Ian Deetlefs	Chief of Defence Reserves; October 2003–2021	Vacant Title next held by Stephen Marumo
Preceded by Brig (Prof) Deon Fourie	Director Part-time Component SA Army; 1995–2003	Succeeded by Maj Gen Keith Mokoape
