= Thulani Zungu =

South African Army

Colonel Thulani Zungu
- Born: 17 September 1962; 64 years ago Soweto
- Military career
- Allegiance: South Africa
- Branch: South African Army
- Service years: 1982–2022
- Rank: Colonel
- Unit: 4 Artillery Regiment
- Commands: SSO Force Preparation, Artillery; OC School of Artillery; OC 4 Artillery Regiment; OC Artillery Mobilisation Regiment
- Awards: Tshumelo Ikatelaho (General Service Medal) Unitas (Unity) Medal Medalje vir Troue Diens (Medal for Loyal Service) Good Service Medal

Col Thulani Zungu is a South African Army officer from the artillery.

== Military career ==
He joined the uMkhonto we Sizwe in 1982 and was trained in Angola. He stayed in exile in Angola, Zambia and returned to South Africa in 1994. He completed Bridging training at Infantry School, Oudtshoorn. He was appointed as an instructor at the School of Artillery, staff officer at Army Headquarters, OC of all regular artillery units in Potchefstroom and senior staff officer (SSO) at the Artillery Formation from 2008.

He completed the Joint Senior Staff course in 2005.

He resigned from the Army in 2022

== Honours and awards ==
- Tshumelo Ikatelaho (General Service Medal)
- Unitas (Unity) Medal
- Medalje vir Troue Diens (Medal for Loyal Service) (20 Year Clasp)
- Good Service Medal (Bronze (10 Years))

Military offices
Preceded by Col Khaya Makina	OC School of Artillery; 2005–2008	Succeeded by Col Dawid Schoonwinkel
Preceded by Lt Col Sarel Kruger	OC 4 Artillery Regiment; 2004–2004	Succeeded by Lt Col Andre Claassen
