= Morris Moadira =

Lieutenant General Morris Motlhamme Moadira CLS MMS
- Born: Batho township, Bloemfontein
- Military career
- Allegiance: South Africa
- Branch: South African Army
- Service years: 1994–2017
- Rank: Lieutenant General
- Unit: ASB Bloemfontein
- Commands: Chief of Logistics; Deputy Chief Logistics; GOC Army Support Base Bloemfontein
- Awards: Conspicuous Leadership Star CLS Merit Medal MMS Operational Medal for Southern Africa South Africa Service Medal General Service Medal (South Africa) Unitas (Unity) Medal Mandela Commemoration Medal Medalje vir Troue Diens (Medal for Loyal Service) Good Service Medal Service Medal

Lieutenant General Morris Moadira CLS MMS is a retired South African Army officer who served as the Chief of Logistics for the South African National Defence Force.

He joined Umkhonto we Sizwe in 1978 before starting training in Angola.

In 2004 he commanded the Army Support Base in Bloemfontein, in the rank of brigadier general before being promoted to major general in 2011 and appointed Deputy Chief of Logistics

== Awards and decorations ==
- Conspicuous Leadership Star (CLS)
- Merit Medal (Silver) (MMS)
- Operational Medal for Southern Africa
- South Africa Service Medal
- General Service Medal (South Africa)
- Unitas (Unity) Medal
- Mandela Commemoration Medal (Gold)
- Medalje vir Troue Diens (Medal for Loyal Service) (30 Year Clasp)
- Good Service Medal (Silver (20 Years))
- Service Medal (Bronze)

Military offices
Preceded by Bongani Mbatha	Chief of Logistics; 2016–2017	Succeeded by Jabu Mbuli
New title	Deputy Chief of Logistics; 2011–2016	Succeeded by Brian Harrison
Preceded by Teddy Nqapayi	GOC ASB Bloemfontein; 2004–2011	Succeeded by Mongezi Cebeni
