= Master Gunners of the South African Army =

Master Gunners (South Africa)

The term "Master Gunner of the Artillery" (Afrikaans: Meesterkanonnier van die artillerie) was introduced in 1982 as the overall head of the artillery. The origin of this term, and its particular prestige, can be found if you trace the history of the Royal Artillery's Long Gunnery Staff Courses, War time Gunnery Staff Courses (LGSC) amongst others. The crossed guns were originally called Gunnery Instructors (IG)(Officers) with other ranks known as Assistant Instructors Gunnery (AIG) from 1979–1990. In 1990 the nomenclature was reversed and the head of the artillery was henceforth called the General of the Artillery. Holders of the crossed barrels in turn became known as Master Gunners. When the first ADA officer was appointed to the post of General of the Artillery, it was changed to General of the Gunners. When General Koos Laubscher was appointed to this post in 2002, he again changed it to General of the Artillery, but when General Roy Andersen was appointed in 2006, he changed it back again to General of the Gunners.

The identification badge for the General of the Gunners ( General of the Gunners) cannot simultaneously be worn with the Artillery No. 1 badge ( Artillery No 1). (Note: NSN-18–187–0476) (Note: Publication Number - ICC 702/2)

== Appointment of Master Gunners ==
The system of choosing who will be invested with this honour is a complicated one. It is as system administered and controlled by the South African Artillery Corps Council whose chairman is the GOC the Artillery Formation. The Corps Council is nowadays composed of full colonels serving within the Formation, the Formation Warrant Officer, RSMs of Regular Artillery units, The GOC, Regular Officers Commanding, Weapon Systems Managers, Directorate Army Acquisition Project Officers and the Secretary. Any other senior gunner officers, serving in common posts in the SANDF, may be co-opted if the Corps Council so desires.

When new appointments of Master Gunners are discussed, this will take place in closed session (Latin: in camera) attended solely by those already bearing the badge. No minutes of deliberations are recorded and the only thing reported by the closed session is what decisions have been taken.

Investiture of new Master Gunners is held at irregular intervals every few years. This usually occurs in Potchefstroom, the Mecca of the Artillery. At the investiture ceremony, newly minted Master Gunners are presented with a Master Gunner's tie, a Step Out badge, a Mess Dress miniature, an A3 certificate signed by either the General Officer Commanding Artillery Formation or The General of the Gunners.

Appointment to the post of General of the Gunners must be sanctioned by the Chief of the Army, even though the first appointment was signed by the Chief of the SADF and Director: Artillery in 1982.

== Prior appointments ==
Historically, any gunner who completed the specialist Gunnery Staff Courses were automatically recognised as Master Gunners in the 1970s. The three "long gunnery courses were presented in South Africa in 1965, 1968 and 1972 and were known respectively as courses No. 1, No. 2 and No. 3. Any graduates of these courses automatically qualified as a Master Gunner and the authority to wear the badge.

In 1984 the then Korpsraad introduced the rules as can be seen on the badge criteria to this day. Typically it works similarly to how a merit medal is awarded, that is that someone writes up a citation, or recommendation in this case, which is then presented for consideration. The citation can be approved or disapproved without any reasons being given either way.

When the GOC is not a Master Gunner himself, the award can only be conferred by the next junior rank who is a Master Gunner.

The Nominal Roll of the recipients of the Master Gunner Badge is proudly displayed within the Headquarters building of 4 Artillery Regiment. Nominally the reason it is there rather than at the Formation Headquarters is for reasons of space. This is credited to the Commander 4 Artillery Regiment, Lt Col Victor Khasapane, and his RSM, WO1 J. Bernie van Zyl MMM.

There is a short list of people who completed the Royal Artillery's Long Gunnery Staff Courses at Larkhill in Great Britain. They are not listed in the nominal roll, but are generally acknowledged to be Master Gunners by right. This list includes Maj Gen Boet Stapelberg, Maj Gen Jan Robbertze, Maj Gen Bob Meintjies, Brigadier "Greyvie" Greyvenstein, Brigadier Leisegang, Brigadier Jack Hawtayne, Brigadier Helm Roos and Brigadier Willie Kotze.

Being invested with the Master Gunner's Badge is a source of pride for all gunners within the South African Artillery fraternity.

Master Gunner
Awarding Authority:	GOC SA Army Artillery Formation	
Description
Dress No 1 – 3 and 5C	Proficiency SA Army Master Gunner, Artillery, Chrome (Crossed gun barrels)	Master Gunner (Artillery Proficiency Badge, Service Dress)
Dress No 5A	Proficiency SA Army Master Gunner, Artillery, Miniature, Chrome (Crossed gun barrels)	Master Gunner (Artillery Proficiency Badge, Service Dress)
Dress No 4	Proficiency SA Army Master Gunner, Artillery, Black on Thatch beige (Crossed gun barrels)	Master Gunner Badge (Qualification and Decoration) Black on Thatch beige, Embossed. Crossed gun barrels
Criteria	1. A serving member of the SAA at the time of the award 2. An RSA citizen of at least seven years standing 3. Successfully completed a long gunnery course OR qualified as indicated in the succeeding sub-subparagraphs 4. Course qualified battery commander or Gun-group Sergeant Major (GSM); 5. Preferably obtained a first class qualification on all his SAA courses 6. Occupied the post of battery commander, or unit 2IC, or artillery instructor (School of Artillery, or Combat Training Centre) or GSM for at least one year 7. His conduct, discipline and bearing must be exemplary and to the satisfaction of the Corps Council; 8. He must have a solid reputation as a capable artilleryman amongst his seniors, contemporaries and juniors 9. It will be to his advantage to have participated in a specific operation, or to have served in an operational area for a period of at least three months 10. He must have produced at least one artillery publication which must: 1. Be used in the SAA as reference or training material; 2. Be an original piece of work and the result of research and study; 3. Be approved by the Corps Council	

== List of Master Gunners ==
List of Master Gunners
Data key	Number	Rank	Surname	First names	Post	Year	Notes
A1001	1001	Major General	Stapelberg	JJ		Before 1970	Grandfathered. Long Gunnery Course, Larkhill, Great Britain. Number is assigned for convenience.
A1002	1002	Major General	Robbertze	Jan		Before 1970	Grandfathered. Long Gunnery Course, Larkhill, Great Britain. Number is assigned for convenience.
A1003	1003	Major General	Meintjies	Bob		Before 1970	Grandfathered. Long Gunnery Course, Larkhill, Great Britain. Number is assigned for convenience.
A1004	1004	Brigadier	Greyvenstein	Hendrik Jacobus 'Greyvie'		Before 1970	Grandfathered. Long Gunnery Course, Larkhill, Great Britain. Number is assigned for convenience.
A1005	1005	Brigadier	Leisegang	Carl Sverre		Before 1970	Grandfathered. Long Gunnery Course, Larkhill, Great Britain. Number is assigned for convenience.
A1006	1006	Brigadier	Hawtaynee	Jack		Before 1970	Grandfathered. Long Gunnery Course, Larkhill, Great Britain. Number is assigned for convenience.
A1007	1007	Brigadier	Kotze	Willie		Before 1970	Grandfathered. Long Gunnery Course, Larkhill, Great Britain. Number is assigned for convenience.
A1008	1008	Brigadier	Roos	Helm		Before 1970	Grandfathered. Long Gunnery Course, Larkhill, Great Britain. Number is assigned for convenience.
A1	1	Colonel	van den Berg	Frans E.C.	Officer Commanding School of Artillery	1970	
A2	2	Major	Nell	A.A.	DS; Army Col	1970	
A3	3	Commandant	van der Walt	P.J.	Officer Commanding; 4 Field Regiment	1972	
A4	4	Commandant	Lombard	Paul M.	Officer Commanding School of Artillery	1970	
A5	5	Major	Wentzel	Charles F. 'Willie'	Battery Commander; 1 Medium Battery; School of Artillery	1972	
A6	6	Major	Linford	Delville	SO2 Training; Western Province Command	1970	
A7	7	Commandant	Bisschoff	J.J. 'Koos'	CISD; Army College	1970	
A8	8	Major	Stempfie	Hugh R.	SO2 Citizen Force; GS1	1970	
A9	9	Major	Gravett	G.W.	SO2 Manpower; GS1	1970	
A10	10	Major	van Heerden	J.M.	OI; Army College	1970	
A11	11	Captain	van Rensburg	J.J.J.	OI; School of Artillery	1970	
A12	12	Major	Veermaak	M.P.H.	Unknown	1970	
A13	13	Major	Holm	O.S.	Unknown	1970	Served at THA (Doornkop) and Sasolburg Commando (CF). Resigned from Permanent Force in 1966
A14	14	Captain	Potgieter	G.I.	Battery Commander; 43 Battery; School of Artillery	1970	
A15	15	Major	Booyse	P.J.G.	2IC; 4 Field Regiment	1970	
A22	22	Major	van der Westhuizen	Christoffel Pierre 'Joffel'	Chief Instructor Gunnery	1971	
A23	23	Major	du Rand	J.P. 'Jaap'	Secondment to Rhodesian Artillery	1971	
A24	24	Major	van Wyk	F.J.	DS; Army College	1971	
A25	25	Major	de Munnick	E.O.	DS; Army College	1971	
A26	26	Major	van Niekerk	G.J.C.	2IC; 2 South African Infantry Battalion Group	1971	
A27	27	Major	Thomas	J.E.	Battery Commander; 3 Loc Battery; School of Artillery	1971	
A28	28	Major	Kotzé	A.A.	SO Research & Development	1971	
A29	29	Major	Wentzel	W. 'Willie'	OI; School of Artillery	1971	
A30	30	Captain	Laubscher	J.A. 'Koos'	OI; School of Artillery	1972	
A31	31	Major	Hurter	Felix Marius 'Baksteen'	OI; School of Artillery	1972	Maj Hurter completed the 3rd South African Long Gunnery Course from the 5 Jun-15 Dec 1972
A32	32	Captain	du Plessis	P.R.B.	Troop Commander; 3 Loc Battery; School of Artillery	1972	
A33	33	Captain	Human	A.C.	Battery Commander; Medium Battery; School of Artillery	1972	
A34	34	Captain	Rheeder	J.L.	OI; South African Coloured Corps; Training Center	1972	
A35	35	Major	Puller	D.I.	Training Officer; 1 Field Regiment; Rhodesian Artillery	1972	Rhodesian
A36	36	Major	Bouwer	C.W.	OI; School of Artillery	1972	
A37	37	Major	van Aswegen	Steve	OI; School of Artillery	1972	
A38	38	Major	de Beer Venter	P.C. 'Chris'	Battery Commander; 1 Medium Battery; 4 Field Artillery	1972	
A39	39	Captain	Bosch	Jack C.D.F.	OI; School of Artillery	1972	
A40	40	Captain	Kotzé	D.J.J.	OI; School of Artillery	1972	
A47	47	WO1	Graham	Robbie	Unknown	1984	Unconfirmed
A48	48	General	Viljoen	Constand L.	Chief South African Defence Force	1984	
A49	49	Commandant	Uys	Piet D.	2IC; Army College	1984	
A50	50	Commandant	Jacobs	Jacobus G. 'Jakes'	Chief Instructor; Gunnery (CIG)	1984	
A51	51	Commandant	de Villiers	D.J.	Chief Instructor; Loc	1984	
A53	53	Commandant	Bothma	H.G.S.	Officer Commanding; 14 Field Regiment	1984	
A54	54	Major	Cilliers	J.K.	SO2 Res & Data; CD Planning	1984	
A55	55	Colonel	Lausberg	J.L.	Officer Commanding; 10 Artillery Brigade	1989	
A56	56	Commandant	Swanepoel	G.H.F.	SO1 Training; 10 Artillery Brigade	1989	
A57	57	Major	Franken	P.	2IC; 4 Artillery Regiment	1989	
A59	59	Commandant	Johnson	I.R.	SO1 Log; 10 Artillery Brigade	1989	
A60	60	Commandant	van Eeden	F.J.G.	SO1 Training & Evaluation; School of Artillery	1989	
A61	61	Commandant	Coetzee	Theuns J.	Chief Instructor; Gunnery (CIG)	1990	
A62	62	Commandant	Potgieter	J.W. 'Jackie'	CIRT	1990	
A63	63	Commandant	Holtzhausen	H.G. 'Deon'	Officer Commanding; 14 Artillery Regiment	1990	
A64	64	Lt Colonel	Phillipson	Leon	SO1 Personnel; D Artillery	1995	
A65	65	Lt Colonel	Mills	Ralph Brian	So1 Artillery Support Project; D Projects	1995	
A66	66	Lt Colonel	Laubscher	Carel C.	Chief Instructor; Gunnery (CIG)	1995	
A67	67	Captain	Crafford	J. Daniel A.	SO3 Artillery Project; D Artillery	1995	
A71	71	Colonel	Schalekamp	Maarten A.	Director Artillery	1996	
A72	72	Brigadier General	Roux	Chris H.	General Officer Commanding; Artillery Formation	2001	
A73	73	Colonel	Breytenbach	F.J.		1999	Resigned on 30 September 1997
A74	74	Lt Colonel	van Niekerk	C.J.G.	CIRT	1999	
A75	75	Lt Colonel	Oelofse	A.J.R.	SO1 Force Structure; Artillery Formation HQ	1999	
A76	76	Lt Colonel	Mynhardt	J.P.	SO1 Ctrl; DPSM	1999	
A77	77	Colonel	van Dyk	Phillip J.	2IC; School of Artillery	1999	
A78	78	Colonel	du Plessis	Niek J.	SSO Combat Systems; DCW	1999	
A79	79	Brigadier General	Notshweleka	M.R. 'Abe'	General Officer Commanding; Artillery Formation	2002	
A80	80	Lt Colonel	de Jager	Andre S.	SO1 AOT; Artillery Formation HQ	2002	
A81	81	Lt Colonel	Kruger	Sarel J.F.	Officer Commanding; 4 Artillery Regiment	2002	
A82	82	Lt Colonel	Jacobs	J.J.	SO1 Combat Readiness; Artillery Formation HQ	2002	
A83	83	Lt Colonel	Schoonwinkel	Dawid B.J.	2IC; School of Artillery	2002	
A84	84	Lt Colonel	Claassen	André J.	Chief Instructor; Gunnery (CIG)	2002	
A85	85	WO1	Botha	F.A.W.	Artillery Formation; Warrant Officer	2002	
A86	86	WO1	Niemand	J.	Regimental Sergeant Major; 4 Artillery Regiment	2000	Awarded later on discovery of an error
A87	87	Lt Colonel	Cronje	J.J.	SO1 Training & Evaluation; School of Artillery	2008	
A88	88	Lt Colonel	du Plessis	P.S.	SO1 Force Structure; Artillery Formation HQ	2008	
A89	89	Lt Colonel	Khasapane	L.V.	Officer Commanding; 4 Artillery Regiment	2008	
A90	90	Lt Colonel	Kritzinger	J.J.	SO1 Artillery Project; DAA	2008	
A91	91	Lt Colonel	Krugel	C.T.	SO1 Combat Readiness; Artillery Formation HQ	2008	
A92	92	Major	le Roux	E.C.	SO1 Artillery Project; DAA	2008	
A93	93	Major	Moraka	J.K.	2IC; 4 Artillery Regiment	2008	
A96	96		-Spoilt Number				96 was awarded to WO1 D Moleko, but he could not attend the investituree on 8 August 2008 and in 2009 another certificate was printed for him with another number.
A97	97	Lt Colonel	Steyn	E.C.D.	2IC; School of Artillery	2009	
A99	99	WO1	Molebatsi	T.J.		2009	
A101	101	WO2	Gordon	C.	Battery Sergeant Major; 43 Battery; 4 Artillery Regiment	2010	
A102	102	Brigadier General	Makina	Khaya	General Officer Commanding; Artillery Formation	2017	
A103	103	Colonel	Maso	Jongile G.	Officer Commanding; Department of Defence; Mobilisation Center	2017	
A104	104	Lt Col	Botha	W.M. 'Buks'	SO1 Compliance; School of Artilleery	2017	
A105	105	Lt Colonel	Croft	L.D.	SO1 Training & Evaluation; School of Artillery	2017	
A106	106	Major	Joshua	E.	OIRT; School of Artillery	2017	
A107	107	Lt Colonel	Tshabalala	M.J. 'Joe'	SO1 Training and Evaluation; School of Artillery	2019	
A108	108	Lt Colonel	Marx	R.	Artillery Branch Commander; Combat Training Center	2019	
A109	109	Master Warrant Officer	Mokoena	M.P.	Regimental Sergeant Major; 4 Artillery Regiment	2019	
A110	110	Major General	Andersen	Roy C.	CD SANDF Reserves; CSD	2019	
A111	111	Lt Colonel	Makhele	M.S.	SO1 Ext Training; Army College	2019	
A112	112	Lt Colonel	Kemp	F.F.	SO1 Artillery Project; DAA	2019	
A113	113	Lt Colonel	Matimbe	Mimi E.	Officer Commanding; 4 Artillery Regiment	2019	
A114	114	Major	Fouché	Gordon D.	SO2 Artillery Project; DAA	2019	
A115	115	Major	Galane	K.	SO2 Policy & Planning; Artillery Formation HQ	2019	
A116	116	Major	Pokolo	M.	SO2 Operations; 4 Artillery Regiment	2019	

=== Corps leadership titles ===
The Gunners' Association publishes the succession of officers who held the corps leadership titles Master Gunner of the Artillery (from 1982), then General of the Artillery, and later General of the Gunners.

Corps leadership
From	Master Gunners of the Artillery	To	Ribbon
22 March 1982	Maj Gen F.E.C. van den Berg SD,SM,MMM	31 December 1986	Southern Cross Decoration SD Southern Cross Medal SM Military Merit Medal MMM
1 January 1987	Lt Gen F.E.C. van den Berg SD,SM,MMM	31 March 1990	Southern Cross Decoration SD Southern Cross Medal SM Military Merit Medal MMM
From	Generals of the Artillery	To	Ribbon
1 April 1990	Lt Gen F.E.C. van den Berg SD,SM,MMM	31 May 1992	Southern Cross Decoration SD Southern Cross Medal SM Military Merit Medal MMM
1 June 1992	Maj Gen P.M. Lombard SM,MMM	2 March 1993	Southern Cross Medal SM Military Merit Medal MMM
3 March 1993	Maj Gen P.O. du Preez SD,SM,MMM	1 July 1993	Southern Cross Decoration SD Southern Cross Medal SM Military Merit Medal MMM
From	Generals of the Gunners	To	Ribbon
2 July 1993	Maj Gen P.O. du Preez SD,SM,MMM	31 May 1995	Southern Cross Decoration SD Southern Cross Medal SM Military Merit Medal MMM
1 June 1995	Lt Gen P.O. du Preez SD,SM,MMM	25 June 1998	Southern Cross Decoration SD Southern Cross Medal SM Military Merit Medal MMM
26 June 1998	Maj Gen C.H. van Zyl SD,SM,MMM	25 April 2002	Southern Cross Decoration SD Southern Cross Medal SM Military Merit Medal MMM
26 April 2002	Maj Gen J.A. Laubscher SM,MMM (Note: Styled General of the Artillery during this appointment)	31 August 2005	Southern Cross Medal SM Military Merit Medal MMM
1 December 2005	Maj Gen R.C. Andersen CSSA,SD,SM,MMM,JCD	12 May 2015	Star of South Africa CSSA Southern Cross Decoration SD Southern Cross Medal SM Military Merit Medal MMM John Chard Decoration JCD
10 February 2017	Lt Gen J.S. Mbuli	31 May 2024	
1 June 2024	Maj Gen W. Mazibuko	Present	
