= Khaya Makina =

South African Army officer (1964–2021)

Brigadier General Khaya Makina
- Born: 6 June 1964; New Brighton, Port Elizabeth
- Died: 25 March 2021 (aged 56); Mookgopong, Limpopo
- Burial place: Heroes Acres, Port Elizabeth
- Military career
- Allegiance: South Africa
- Branch: South African Army
- Service years: 1984–2021
- Rank: Brigadier General
- Nickname: Joe Mavi
- Unit: School of Artillery
- Commands: GOC Artillery Formation; COS Artillery Formation; SSO Force Preparation, Artillery Formation; OC School of Artillery
- Awards: Unitas (Unity) Medal Medalje vir Troue Diens (Medal for Loyal Service) Good Service Medal

Brig. Gen. Khaya Makina (6 June 1964 – 25 March 2021) was a General Officer in the South African Army from the artillery. He was born in New Brighton location in Port Elizabeth on 6 June 1964. He matriculated from Khwezi Lomso High School in 1982. He joined the uMkhonto we Sizwe and went into exile in the Kingdom of Lesotho and later in the Republic of Angola where he completed military training.

== Military career ==
He specialized in ground engineering and field artillery. He completed the Brigade Commanders Course at Simferopol Military College in the Crimean Oblast, Soviet Union in 1991. In South Africa, he served as a Company Commander and Operations Officer in the National Peacekeeping Force from January to May 1994 at De Brug and in Koeberg.

He completed the bridging training at the Air Defence Artillery School in Diskobolos. He served as a Battery Commander of Support Battery at the School of Artillery in 1995, Regimental Training Wing Commander in 1999, Officer Commanding School of Artillery during 2002–2004. The then Lt. Col. Makina completed the penultimate single service Senior Command and Staff Duties Course of the SA Army in 2001. He served as the SSO Force Preparation for the Artillery Formation from 2005 to 2008, SSO Research & Development from 2008 to 2013. Chief of Staff Artillery Formation during 2014 to 2015, he was promoted to the rank of brigadier general on 1 Jan. 2016 and appointed the General Officer Commanding SA Army Artillery Formation. Brig Gen Makina was awarded the master gunner by the senior artilleryman present-Maj Gen Deon Holtzhausen at the crossed-barrels investiture held at the Ubique Hall, School of Artillery on 17 March 2017. He died in Mookgopong on 25 March 2021.

== Honours and awards ==
=== Medals ===
- Unitas (Unity) Medal
- Medalje vir Troue Diens (Medal for Loyal Service) (20 Year Clasp)
- Good Service Medal (Bronze (10 Years))

=== Proficiency badges ===
Master Gunner #102
Master Gunner badge
Brigadier General; Khaya Makina (Note: Post occupied when award was made: General Officer Commanding, Artillery Formation)
Year: 2017
← #101; WO2; C. Gordon	#103 → Colonel; Jongile G. Maso

== Notes ==
Military offices
Preceded by Brig Gen Deon Holtzhausen	General Officer Commanding Artillery Formation; 2016–2021	Succeeded by Brig Gen Jongile Maso
Preceded by Col Andy Oelofse	Chief of Staff Artillery Formation; 2014–2015	Succeeded by Col Andre de Jager
Preceded by Col Dawid Schoonwinkel	SSO Research & Development, Artillery Formation; 2008–2013	Succeeded by Col Tiaan Krugel
Preceded by Col Sarel Kruger	SSO Force Preparation, Artillery Formation; 2005–2008	Succeeded by Col Thulani Zungu
Preceded by Col Perie Franken	OC School of Artillery; 2002–2004	Succeeded by Col Thulani Zungu
Preceded by Lt Col Chris van Niekerk	Chief Instructor Regimental Training; 1999–2001	Succeeded by Lt Col Neels Odendaal
Honorary titles
Preceded by WO2 C. Gordon	102^{nd} Master Gunner; 2017	Succeeded by Col Jongile Maso
