= Union Medal =

- Type: Military long service medal
- Awarded for: 18 years of good service
- Country: South Africa
- Presented by: The monarch of the United Kingdom and the Commonwealth realms
- Eligibility: Permanent Force, all ranks
- Clasps: 30 years of good service
- Status: Discontinued in 1961
- Established: 1952
- First award: 1952
- 18 Years and 30 Years service ribbon bars

SADF pre-1994 & SANDF post-2002 orders of wear
- Next (higher): SADF precedence: Good Service Medal, Silver; SANDF precedence: Medalje vir Troue Diens and Bar, 20 years
- Next (lower): SADF succession: Permanent Force Good Service Medal; SANDF succession: Permanent Force Good Service Medal

The Union Medal was instituted by the Union of South Africa in 1952. It was awarded to Permanent Force members of the South African Defence Force for eighteen years of service and good conduct.

== The South African military ==
The Union Defence Forces (UDF) were established in 1912 and renamed the South African Defence Force (SADF) in 1958. On 27 April 1994, it was integrated with six other independent forces into the South African National Defence Force (SANDF).

== Institution ==
The Union Medal was instituted by Queen Elizabeth II on 6 April 1952, during the Tercentenary Van Riebeeck Festival.

== Award criteria ==
The medal could be awarded to Permanent Force members of the South African Defence Force for eighteen years of good service. A clasp could be awarded after thirty years of service.

== Order of wear ==
With effect from 6 April 1952, when the Union Medal and several other new decorations and medals were instituted, these new awards took precedence before all earlier British orders, decorations and medals awarded to South Africans, with the exception of the Victoria Cross, which still took precedence before all other awards. The other older British awards continued to be worn in the order prescribed by the British Central Chancery of the Orders of Knighthood.

The position of the Union Medal in the official order of precedence was revised three times after 1975, to accommodate the inclusion or institution of new decorations and medals, first upon the integration into the South African National Defence Force on 27 April 1994, again when decorations and medals were belatedly instituted in April 1996 for the two former non-statutory forces, the Azanian People's Liberation Army and Umkhonto we Sizwe, and again when a new series of military orders, decorations and medals was instituted in South Africa on 27 April 2003.

South African Defence Force until 26 April 1994

- Official SADF order of precedence:
  - Preceded by the Good Service Medal, Silver.
  - Succeeded by the Permanent Force Good Service Medal.
- Official national order of precedence. This national precedence was in error in respect of the next lower medal as determined according to their dates of institution. It was corrected by 1994.
  - Preceded by the Railways and Harbours Police Medal for Faithful Service.
  - Succeeded by the Permanent Force Good Service Medal of 1961. (This is an error and should be the Railway Police Good Service Medal of 1960.)

South African National Defence Force from 27 April 1994

- Official SANDF order of precedence:
  - Preceded by the Long Service Medal, Silver of the Republic of Venda.
  - Succeeded by the Permanent Force Good Service Medal of the Republic of South Africa.
- Official national order of precedence:
  - Preceded by the Railways and Harbours Police Medal for Faithful Service of the Republic of South Africa.
  - Succeeded by the Railway Police Good Service Medal of the Republic of South Africa.

South African National Defence Force from April 1996

- Official SANDF order of precedence:
  - Preceded by the Silver Service Medal of the Azanian People's Liberation Army.
  - Succeeded by the Permanent Force Good Service Medal of the Republic of South Africa.
- Official national order of precedence:
  - Preceded by the Railways and Harbours Police Medal for Faithful Service of the Republic of South Africa.
  - Succeeded by the Railway Police Good Service Medal of the Republic of South Africa.

South African National Defence Force from 27 April 2003

- Official SANDF order of precedence:
  - Preceded by the Medalje vir Troue Diens and Bar, 20 years of the Republic of South Africa.
  - Succeeded by the Permanent Force Good Service Medal of the Republic of South Africa.
- Official national order of precedence:
  - Preceded by the Railways and Harbours Police Medal for Faithful Service of the Republic of South Africa.
  - Succeeded by the Railway Police Good Service Medal of the Republic of South Africa.

== Description ==
Obverse

The Union Medal is a medallion with a scalloped edge and a raised rim, 38 millimetres in diameter and 3 millimetres thick at the rim and struck in silver, depicting the pre-1994 South African coat of arms encircled with the inscription "UNIE-MEDALJE • UNION MEDAL". The ribbon suspender is decorated with proteas and leaves.

Reverse

The reverse depicts Queen Elizabeth II's royal cipher, a crown over "E II R", and has a raised rim and decorated ribbon suspender, similar to those of the obverse. The medals and ribbon suspenders were minted separately and soldered together. The medal number was impressed at the bottom on the rim.

Ribbon

The ribbon is 32 millimetres wide, with bands of orange, white and blue repeated, three times, the outer orange and blue bands each 4 millimetres wide and the seven inner bands all approximately 3½ millimetres wide. Orange, white and blue are the colours of the pre-1994 national flag.

Clasp

Clasp

The clasp, awarded after thirty years of service, was struck in silver and is 1 1/4 inches (32 millimetres) wide, with the coat of arms of South Africa in the centre and with a hole at each corner to enable it to be sewn to the ribbon. When ribbons only are worn, recipients of the clasp would wear a silver button on the ribbon bar, embellished with the South African coat of arms.

== Discontinuation ==
Conferment of the Union Medal was discontinued on 31 May 1961, when South Africa became a republic and the medal was replaced by the Permanent Force Good Service Medal.
