= Constand Viljoen =

South African Army officer and politician (1933–2020)

General Constand Viljoen SSA SD SOE SM MMM
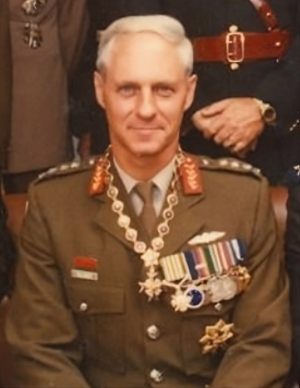
- Viljoen in 1985

Leader of the Freedom Front
- In office 1 March 1994 – 26 June 2001
- Preceded by: Party established
- Succeeded by: Pieter Mulder

Member of Parliament
- In office 1994–2001

Personal details
- Born: Constand Laubscher Viljoen; 28 October 1933 Standerton, Transvaal, Union of South Africa
- Died: 3 April 2020 (aged 86) Ohrigstad, Limpopo, South Africa
- Resting place: Bet-El farm, Ohrigstad
- Party: Freedom Front Plus (1994–2001)
- Other political affiliations: National Party (pre–1994)
- Spouse: Christina "Ristie" Heckroodt (m. 1957)
- Relations: Braam Viljoen (twin brother); Andries Carel Viljoen 1889–1947 (father); Geesie Maria Viljoen née Kotzé 1905–1990 (mother)
- Children: 5
- Education: University of Pretoria
- Occupation: Soldier, farmer and politician
- Profession: Gunner, artilleryman
- Civilian awards: Star of South Africa SSAG

Military service
- Allegiance: South Africa
- Branch/service: South African Army
- Years of service: 1956–1985
- Rank: General
- Unit: 4 Field Regiment
- Commands: Chief of the South African Defence Force; Chief of the Army; GOC I South African Corps; Director of General Operations; Director of Artillery; OC South African Army College; Second in command Orange Free State Command; OC School of Artillery; OC 14 Field Regiment; Battery Commander 10 Field Battery, 4 Field Regiment; Chief Instructor Gunnery, School of Artillery & Armour
- Battles/wars: South African Border War; Operation Savannah
- Military awards: Paratrooper Basic; Master Gunner Badge

General Constand Laubscher Viljoen SSA SD SOE SM MMM (28 October 1933 – 3 April 2020) was a South African Army officer and politician. As the Chief of the South African Defense Forces from 1980 – 1985, he oversaw military attacks on the anti-apartheid movement both within South Africa and neighbouring countries. During South Africa's transition from apartheid to democracy, he co-founded the Afrikaner Volksfront, a separatist group, and planned to lead an armed insurgency. After participating in discussions with Nelson Mandela and leading a failed armed incursion in Bophuthatswana, Viljoen left the Volksfront and founded the Freedom Front political party. His decision to participate in the first universal elections was instrumental in quashing the plans of white separatists to pursue armed insurgency. He served seven years in parliament and, due to the conditions of the transitional constitution of 1993, served as the first Leader of Opposition until the departure of De Klerk from the government in 1996.

== Early life and education ==
In 1933, Viljoen and his identical twin brother, Abraham (Braam), were born in the town of Standerton, Mpumalanga. Their ancestors were 17th century European settlers. During the Anglo-Boer war, their father Andries had been interned in a concentration camp as a child with his mother and his siblings while his father fought the British in a Boer militia.

Constand and Braam grew up on Potfontein, the family farm. Viljoen graduated from Standerton High School in 1951. His political views differed from his family's: they supported Jan Smuts and the United Party, while he supported the National Party. His brother Braam became an anti-apartheid activist, theology professor, and clergyman. Viljoen was interested in fighting insurgencies.

== Military service ==
He joined South Africa's pre-republic Union Defence Force at the Military Gymnasium in Voortrekkerhoogte for the Permanent Force Cadet Course of which he won the "Best Student" in 1952. He studied at the Military Academy from 1953 and graduated as Best Student in 1955 receiving a degree in military science at the University of Pretoria. He was among others Aide de Camp to Dr EG Jansen, Battery Commander at 4 Field Regiment, Instructor at the School of Artillery and Armour, OC 14 Field Regiment in Bethlehem, OC School of Artillery. Second in Command Orange Free State Command in 1968.

Col Viljoen qualified as a paratrooper at this time in Bloemfontein. OC Army College, Director of Artillery (on the staff of the Chief of the Army) and Director Management Services (on the staff of the Chief of Defence Staff). By 1974, Viljoen had been named the South African Army's Director of General Operations, subsequently serving as the Principal Staff Officer to the Chief of the South African Defence Force. He was appointed as Chief of the Army in 1977 and succeeded General Magnus Malan as Chief of the South African Defence Force in 1980. He was awarded the Master Gunner badge (crossed-barrels) in 1984.

=== Angola ===
Viljoen was the senior SADF military officer directing Operation Savannah in 1975.

Viljoen is credited with having planned the first major airborne assault in South African military history, the Battle of Cassinga, in 1978 in Angola. Despite his rank, Viljoen was present, offering what was described as a "swashbuckling" front-line leadership, which won him the respect of many fellow soldiers. According to Viljoen, it was an attack on a base belonging to SWAPO, the Namibian independence movement. The incident is also known as the Cassinga massacre. According to scholar Annette Hubschle and others, the attack killed more than 600 people, mostly civilians, in a refugee camp. In 1998, the Truth and Reconciliation Commission released a report holding Viljoen responsible for the attack, which it condemned as a human rights violation. In 2007, Viljoen stated that some civilians were present but that most of the dead were fighters.

=== Apartheid ===
In 1980, the newly elected prime minister P.W. Botha selected Viljoen as Chief of the SADF, a position he held until he retired in 1985. Of the black soldiers in the SADF, he once stated: "If they can fight for South Africa, then they can vote for South Africa." Viljoen considered the uMkhonto weSizwe (MK), the armed wing of the African National Congress, to be weak, believing that the SADF could indefinitely hold them off. According to Viljoen, the ANC started a "people's war" in the townships. The SADF's armed operations to repress the ANC harmed the South African government's reputation to the rest of the world. In the 1980s, white rule ended in Rhodesia and South Africa was experiencing increased international isolation. Viljoen and other military leaders urged the South African government to negotiate with the anti-apartheid movement as soon as possible, stating: "you end up in a much weaker position than if you had tackled the thing politically at the right moment.”

While Viljoen was chief of the SADF, Botha directed the army to undertake operations with the security police against the ANC in the townships and in neighboring countries. Under Viljoen's command, the SADF mounted attacks in Lesotho, Zimbabwe, Botswana, and Mozambique. Viljoen publicly praised the Raid on Gaborone, the SADF's first attack on Botswana that killed several civilians. He internally criticized the army for killing six civilians in Mozambique in 1983. Because of the brutality of the SADF towards the anti-apartheid movement under Viljoen's command, many black South Africans viewed him to be racist. British journalist John Carlin called him and the military "apartheid’s ultimate enforcers."

== Political career ==
=== End of apartheid ===
In March 1993, toward the end of apartheid, Viljoen and three other retired generals co-founded the Afrikaner Volksfront (Afrikaner People's Front), an umbrella body for separatist Afrikaner groups that wanted to create their own homeland in Transvaal. Viljoen told The New York Times that he did not want South Africa to be ruled by "Marxists" and that the Volksfront had not decided whether they would use violence. Viljoen had strained relationships with other white leaders including the neo-Nazi Afrikaner Weerstandsbeweging (AWB) and the Conservative Party. In June, Viljoen led a Volksfront protest outside the negotiations for the South African constitution. Despite his attempts to control the crowd, they ignored him and stormed the Kempton Park World Trade Centre.

Viljoen planned to command an armed insurgency consisting of as many as 60,000 white soldiers. He told General George Meiring, "You and I and our men can take this country in an afternoon". Meiring responded: "but what do we the morning after the coup?" In 1993, Viljoen accepted an invitation to meet with African National Congress leader Nelson Mandela, whom he considered a terrorist. Over the course of their discussions, Mandela urged him to participate in the upcoming elections instead of launching an insurgency. These events were depicted in the 2018 comic book Mandela and The General by John Carlin.

In January 1994, Mandela stated that the Afrikaaners would not be permitted to create a homeland. Viljoen stated for the first time that the Volksfront was willing to use violence. At the time, polls showed that most Afrikaaners did not support a separate homeland. In March 1994, Viljoen led an incursion by several thousand Volksfront militia into Bophuthatswana, a bantustan. Viljoen was attempting to support the government against protesters who wanted the bantustan to join the Republic of South Africa. Despite being requested not to participate in the action because of extremist views, militants of the AWB also advanced into Bophuthatswana, sparking clashes with the security forces. After their efforts in Bophuthatswana failed, Viljoen left the Volksfront and registered a political campaign in the upcoming elections. He co-founded and became leader of the Freedom Front (Vryheidsfront), a new political party representing white conservatives.

Viljoen helped to convince other white right-wingers against pursuing violence during the transition from apartheid to democracy. According to Viljoen, about half of the Volksfront members favored armed insurgency, while the other half opposed it. He said that he was the one who decided that they would not pursue violence and that it was a difficult decision. He later credited Mandela as the primary reason for this decision saying: "The important thing when you sit down and negotiate with the enemy is the character of the people you have across the table from you and whether they carry their people's support. Mandela had both." He was also partly influenced by the mediation of his identical twin brother, Braam, an anti-apartheid activist who had helped arrange the meeting with Mandela. The Dutch Reformed Church, of which Viljoen was a member, also pressured him not to wage war.

=== In post-apartheid South Africa ===
In the 1994 general election, the Freedom Front, under the leadership of Viljoen, received 2.2% of the national vote and nine seats in the National Assembly. As the VF became the strongest party outside Nelson Mandela's Government of National Unity, as the provisional 1993 Constitution required the participation of all parties over 5% of the vote, Viljoen became the de facto leader of the opposition in South Africa until the NP's departure from government in 1996, although he did not officially hold the position.

In August 1996, Viljoen appeared before the Truth and Reconciliation Commission (TRC) and said that both sides had committed human rights violations. He said that Afrikaaners were responsible for not pressuring their leaders to negotiate with the ANC sooner. He also said that the TRC should be careful not to focus on past transgressions to avoid exacerbating conflict. In December 1996, Mandela expanded the eligibility for amnesty applications to the TRC. Previously, people could apply for amnesty for acts committed until 10 December 1993, but that was extended to 10 May 1994. As a result, Viljoen was able to apply for amnesty for his abandoned plan to mount an insurgency in the period before the 1994 election.

Although his supporters were at odds with the government and the ANC, Viljoen praised Mandela on the occasion of his retirement from politics in 1999, ending his Parliamentary speech speaking in Mandela's native language, Xhosa: "Go and have yourself a well-earned rest. Go rest in the shadow of a tree at your home."

In 2001, Viljoen handed over the leadership of the Freedom Front to Pieter Mulder and retired from politics, citing his frustration working with a parliament dominated by the ANC. On the occasion of his retirement from politics, the South African government recognised him for preventing bloodshed during the transition from apartheid to democracy.

== After retirement ==
In 2003, a member of the Boeremag right-wing militia testified in court that the group had wanted to prosecute Viljoen after they overthrew the South African government. They considered him a traitor who had betrayed the Afrikaner people.

In 2008 Viljoen, aged 74, put up what was described as a spirited fight against two would-be muggers, who were subsequently arrested.

In 2014, he criticized ANC leadership and South African democracy, saying: "President Nelson Mandela took his special brand of leadership to the grave with him."

== Death ==
Viljoen died of natural causes on his farm in Ohrigstad, Limpopo, on 3 April 2020, age 86. He was survived by his wife Christina Susanna Heckroodt, four sons and a daughter.

President Cyril Ramaphosa, the Nelson Mandela Foundation, and John Steenhuisen praised Viljoen for choosing to negotiate with the ANC instead of waging an insurgency, thus assisting in the transition from apartheid to democracy in South Africa. Former Democratic Alliance politician Tony Leon called Viljoen "one of the heroes of our democracy". Pieter Groenewald and Pieter Mulder praised Viljoen's contributions to the SADF, with Mulder stating that Viljoen strived to "lead from the front not from behind".

ANC leader Mac Maharaj stated: “Viljoen made the transition from the leader of the right-wing, who threatened to derail the negotiating process, to someone who agreed that negotiations were the right way to go. But we cannot forget that he also rose to become the top military commander under apartheid, who was highly praised, and that he led the raid on Cassinga." ANC politician Carl Niehaus published an op-ed arguing that Viljoen had never actually intended to wage an insurgency and had only used it to achieve concessions from the ANC, including "securing the apartheid-accumulated wealth and land ownership of whites".

== Awards and decorations ==
- Star of South Africa (Gold) (SSAG)
- Southern Cross Decoration (SD)
- South African Police Star for Outstanding Service (SOE)
- Southern Cross Medal (1952) (SM)
- Military Merit Medal (MMM)
- Pro Patria Medal (South Africa) (with Cunene Clasp) (Note: Only the Cunene clasp was awarded, to members who served in Angola during Operation Savannah in 1975 and 1976. Recipients of the clasp wear a button, with the letter C encircled by a wreath, on the ribbon bar.)
- Good Service Medal (Gold (30 Years))
- Good Service Medal (Silver (20 Years))
- Permanent Force Good Service Medal
- Order of the Cloud and Banner (2^{nd} Grade - with Grand Cordon) (ORB)
- Unidentified Paraguayan decoration

Proficiency badges
Master Gunner #48 Master Gunner badge General; Constand L. Viljoen (Note: Post occupied when award was made: Chief South African Defence Force) Year: 1984: ← #47; WO1; Robbie Graham / #49 → Commandant; Piet D. Uys	Paratrooper Basic (Qualification) Basic, Static Line. Black on Thatch beige, Embossed. Small Black wings

== Notes ==
Party political offices
New title New Party	Leader of the Freedom Front; 1994–2001	Succeeded by Dr Pieter Mulder
Military offices
Preceded by Magnus Malan	Chief of the South African Defence Force; 1980–1985	Succeeded by Johannes Geldenhuys
Preceded by Magnus Malan	Chief of the South African Army; 1976–1980	Succeeded by Johannes Geldenhuys
Preceded by Maj Gen Andre van Deventer	GOC I South African Corps; 1976–1976	Succeeded by Maj Gen Ian Gleeson
Preceded by Col Frans van den Berg	Director of Artillery; 1972–1973	Succeeded by Brig Frans van den Berg
Preceded by Brig LL Gordon	Director Management Services; 1970–1972	Succeeded by Cdre Ronald A. Edwards
Preceded by Col JW van Niekerk	OC South African Army College; 1968–1969	Succeeded by Col Johan Potgieter
Preceded by Cmdt Hendrik Greyvenstein	OC School of Artillery; 1966–1968	Succeeded by Cmdt Shorty Brown
Preceded by Maj Helm Roos	Chief Instructor Gunnery; 1962–1963	Succeeded by Maj John Albert Reid Cox
Honorary titles
Preceded by WO1 Robbie Graham	48th Master Gunner; 1984	Succeeded by Cmdt Piet Uys
