= Jabu Mbuli =

Lieutenant General Jabulani Sydney Mbuli
- Born: 1963 (age 62–63); Springs, Transvaal
- Military career
- Allegiance: South Africa
- Branch: South African Army
- Service years: 1994–2022
- Rank: Lieutenant General
- Nickname: Jabu
- Unit: South African Army Air Defence Artillery Formation
- Commands: Chief of Logistics; Chief Director Defence Acquisition; GOC ADA Fmn
- Awards: Unitas (Unity) Medal Mandela Commemoration Medal Medalje vir Troue Diens (Medal for Loyal Service) Service Medal

Lieutenant General Jabu Mbuli was a South African Army officer from the Air Defence Artillery who served as Chief of Logistics for the South African National Defence Force. He has a wife and 3 daughters, 2 still alive.

He joined uMkhonto we Sizwe and was trained in Angola. He was appointed as the GOC ADA Formation, Chief Director Defence Acquisition Management in 2014 and Chief of Logistics upon retirement of Lt Gen Morris Moadira in 2017. Lt Gen Mbuli also served as the General of the Gunners of South Africa from 2017. He retired from the SANDF on 31 December 2022 and was succeeded by the Deputy Chief of Logistics, Lt Gen XB Ndhlovu, on 1 January 2023.

== Awards and decorations ==
General of the Gunners (Post)
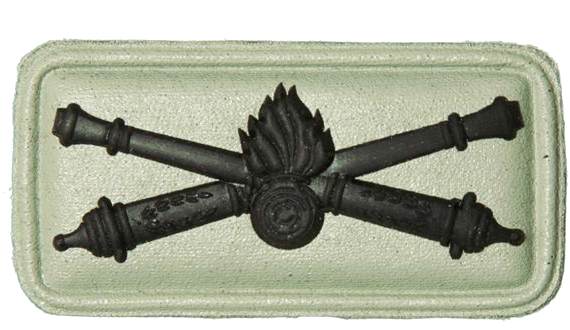
Black on Thatch beige, Embossed. Crossed gun barrels with grenade

- Unitas (Unity) Medal
- Mandela Commemoration Medal (Gold)
- Medalje vir Troue Diens (Medal for Loyal Service) (30 Year Clasp)
- Service Medal (Bronze)

Honorary titles
Preceded by Maj Gen Roy Andersen	General of the Gunners; 2017–	Incumbent
Military offices
Preceded by Lt Gen Morris Moadira	Chief of Logistics; 2017–2022	Succeeded by Lt Gen Xolani Ndhlovu
Preceded by Maj Gen Abe Notshweleka	Chief Director Defence Acquisition Management; 2014–2017	Succeeded by R Adm Muggies Morris
Preceded by Brig Gen Steve Marumo	GOC ADA Formation –2014	Succeeded by Brig Gen Sandile Hlongwa
