= School of Artillery (South Africa) =

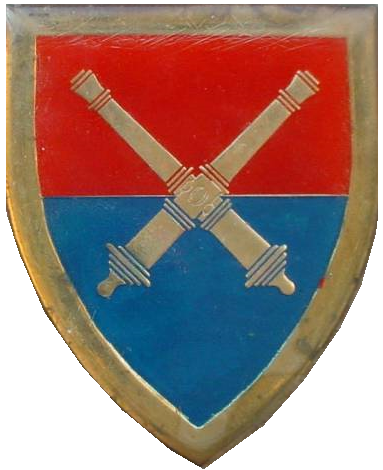
- SANDF School of Artillery Emblem
- Active: 1934 – current
- Country: South Africa
- Branch: South African Army
- Type: Corps school
- Role: Artillery training school
- Part of: South African Army Artillery Formation
- Garrison/HQ: Potchefstroom, North West province 26.67099°S 27.07446°E
- Nickname: "Artskool"
- Patron: St Barbara
- Mottos: Per Scientiam Vires (Strength through Science)
- Colors: Oxford blue and Postal Red

Commanders
- Current commander: Col Tiger Johnson

Insignia
- Collar Badge: Bursting grenade with seven flames
- Beret Colour: Oxford Blue
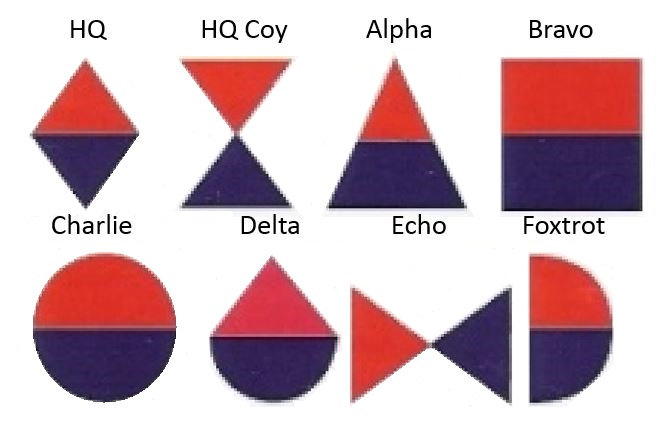
- Artillery Battery Emblems

- Artillery Beret Bar circa 1992

The School of Artillery is the South African Army's specialized artillery training school

== History ==
=== Origin ===
Before the establishment of a South African artillery school in 1934 there were a number of earlier artillery training establishments. The first was formed at the Cape in August 1786 with Lt. Louis-Michel Thibault, later better known as an architect, as head of the ‘Militaire School’. It did not operate for long.

Almost a hundred years later an artillery school was proposed by Capt W E Giles, Royal Artillery, in a document submitted to the Cape Colonial Government in March 1880. It was not accepted.

=== School of Gunnery ===
On 14 September 1912 when the five regiments of the SA Mounted Rifles were about to be established, a School of Gunnery was opened at Auckland Park, Johannesburg, in the lines of the Transvaal Horse Artillery. Its purpose was to train officers and NCO’s for the first three permanent batteries that were to be established. The school closed down when war broke out in 1914 after only two courses had been completed.

=== Artillery Training Depot ===
The next artillery training institution was the Artillery Training Depot, established at Wynberg Camp, Cape Town, in August 1915 to train the artillery batteries that fought in East Africa, and later in Palestine.

=== Establishment of the Artillery Corps ===
A corps of South African Artillery was established by proclamation on 1 September 1934 to incorporate all the Permanent and Citizen Force units and on 7 September the two batteries lost their battery status and were formed into an Artillery Training Depot, armed with 4.5 inch howitzers, 18-pdrs and 3.7 inch howitzers.

The Depot staff was responsible for the training of all artillery recruits and all artillery units, except Cape Field Artillery (CFA), which was the responsibility of the Cape Command Training Depot.

=== Artillery School ===
By August 1935 the Artillery Training Depot was organized as a Depot Headquarters with three batteries. And on 24 October 1936 the title was altered to that of ‘Artillery School’. War was declared on 6 September 1939 and with no suitable area near Pretoria for gunnery practice, the School moved to Potchefstroom.

During the time the School was at Potchefstroom it underwent various changes of designation and became a unit of the Citizen Force when its title was altered to Artillery and Armoured Corps Training School (V), South African Artillery from 1 January 1944.

When the war was over it was re-established on 14 June 1946 as a Permanent Force unit known as the School of Artillery and Armour. It was housed in the main camp but when 4 Field Training Regiment was formed in 1953 the School moved to the former SA Air Force base below Hospital Hill.

Armour training was moved to Bloemfontein in 1964, and the school became a separate unit known simply as the School of Artillery on 1 February 1964, a name it has since retained.

It was awarded the freedom of Potchefstroom on 10 March 1978.

== Training ==
The School conducts the following training:

Basic Instruction which includes: drill, safety, operation of muzzle loading, procedures for each position of a crew. Students are provided with knowledge of the various artillery systems, knowledge in the areas of observed fire, fire direction, and to manage maintenance.

Advanced Instruction includes: drill, safety, and operation up to battery level. Students are provided with the knowledge of manoeuvre force, target acquisition, survey, and counter-fire. Also included are typical field gunnery problems, fire direction, observed fire, and firing battery operations.

Officers are trained to manage fire direction operations, target acquisitioning, and deployment, in support management, maintenance and supply procedures, as well as communications/electronics. Officers may be eventually utilised as commanders, fire support officers, or fire direction officers.

Instructors Training: Students may also become Instructors in their own right after a period of time in the Formation.

== Sections of the School ==
The following subdivisions of the School of Artillery are headed by Chief Instructors or SO1 level senior officers at the rank of lieutenant colonel with the exception of Support Wing which is headed by major:

- Gunnery Wing (officers training)
- Regimental Training Wing (other ranks training)
- Training and Evaluation Wing (overall training supervisor and quality assurance)
- Management and Second in Command (staff functions including personnel, logistics, finance)
- Support Wing (security, intelligence, quartermaster, base maintenance, chaplaincy, OHS and RHQ)

== Equipment ==
=== Conventional Artillery ===
Variant	Description	Comment	Image
G1 Howitzer	25 pounder, high explosive, anti tank and smoke shells	United Kingdom design	SANDF G1 Cannon
G2 Howitzer	5.5 inch medium gun, high explosive	United Kingdom design	SANDF G2 Cannon
G4 Howitzer	155mm, high explosive	Israel design, stopgap until the G5 cannon entered service	SANDF G4 Cannon
G5 Howitzer	155mm, high explosive, Samil 100 Gun tractor	South Africa design	G5 with Samil 100 Gun tractor
G6 Howitzer	155mm, high explosive, Self driven	South Africa design	SANDF G6 Rhino

=== Multiple Rocket Launcher Systems ===
Variant	Description	Comment	Image
Valkiri MRLS	127mm rocket MLRS	South Africa design Unimog chassis, pre fragmented warhead, 24 launch tubes	Valkiri multiple rocket launcher system
Bateleur MRLS	127mm rocket MLRS	South Africa design Kwevoel chassis, pre fragmented warhead, 40 launch tubes	Bateleur Multiple Rocket Launcher

=== Unmanned Aerial Vehicle ===
Variant	Description	Comment	Image
Vulture UAV	Vulture unmanned aerial vehicle	South Africa design. Used for target acquisition, fall-of-shot detection and fire correction in support of Towed and Self Propelled Gun Howitzer Systems.	Vulture Launcher Samil 100

== Insignia ==
=== Previous Dress Insignia ===
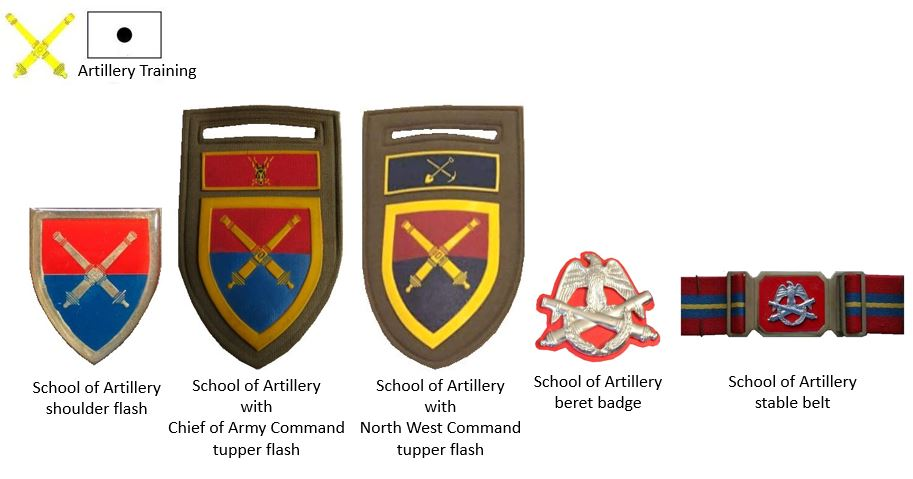
SADF era School of Artillery Insignia

=== Current Dress Insignia ===
==== Master Gunner ====
The prestigious Master Gunner award has been conferred on a large number of people serving at the School. This list includes at least two Commanding Officers, nine Officer Instructors (OI), four in the post of SO1 Training & Evaluation, one Troop Commander, three second-in-commands (2IC) and four Battery Commanders.

Master Gunner

Master Gunner Badge (Qualification and Decoration)
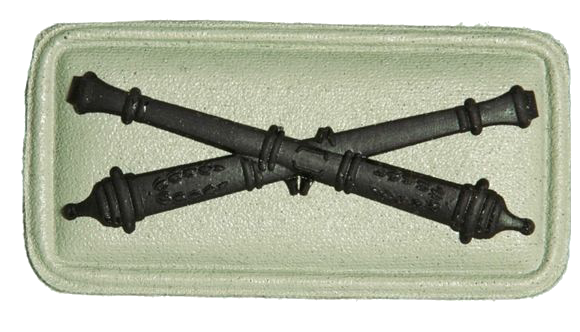
Black on Thatch beige, Embossed. Crossed gun barrels

==== Proficiency badges ====
Proficiency badges
General of the Gunners (Post) Black on Thatch beige, Embossed. Crossed gun barrels with grenade	Artillery No 1 (Qualification) Black on Thatch beige, Embossed. Gun image

== SA School of Artillery Leadership ==
From	Commanding Officers	To	Ribbon
10 December 1963	Cmdt H.J. Greyvenstein UKLGSC (Note: United Kingdom Long Gunnery Staff Course)	2 October 1966	
3 October 1966	Cmdt C.L. Viljoen (Note: Later General Constand Viljoen SSA SD SOE SM MMM MP – Chief of the SADF)	31 January 1968	
1 February 1968	Cmdt R.F. Brown	18 December 1968	
19 December 1968	Col J.D. Potgieter SM	29 August 1969	Southern Cross Medal SM
30 August 1969	Col R.F. Brown	30 April 1970	
1 May 1970	Col F.E.C. van den Berg UKLGSC	14 August 1973	
15 August 1973	Col J.J. Bisschoff	29 February 1976	
1 March 1976	Col P.M. Lombard UKLGSC	7 January 1980	
8 January 1980	Col C.F. Wentzel	31 December 1982	
1 January 1983	Col J.A. Laubscher	8 January 1987	
9 January 1987	Col J.G. Jacobs	3 January 1991	
4 January 1991	Col M.A. Schalekamp SM,MMM	30 April 1995	Southern Cross Medal SM Military Merit Medal MMM
1 May 1995	Col T.J. Coetzee HC,MMM	31 December 1998	Honoris Crux (1975) HC Military Merit Medal MMM
1 January 1999	Col P. Franken MMM	1 January 2002	Military Merit Medal MMM
1 February 2002	Col K. Makina	1 December 2004	
1 January 2005	Col T. Zungu	31 March 2008	
1 April 2008	Col D.B.J. Schoonwinkel	2020-3-31	
1 June 2021	Col S.T.J. Johnson	incumbent	
From	Regimental Sergeants Major	To	Ribbon
4 January 1957	WO1 J.J.D. Nortjé	2 July 1967	
6 July 1967	WO1 A.P. Van Den Berg	30 June 1969	
1 July 1969	WO1 J.D. Kruger	31 December 1969	
1 January 1970	WO1 J.H.J. Willemse PMM	12 May 1974	Pro Merito Medal PMM
13 May 1974	WO1 Mark T. Terwin	31 December 1977	
1 January 1978	WO1 Albert E. Hook	6 December 1980	
7 December 1980	WO1 Dirk J. Venter	31 December 1982	
1 January 1983	WO1 Willem J. Van Coller	28 February 1984	
29 February 1984	WO1 Cas J. Badenhorst	30 April 1987	
1 May 1987	WO1 Ally E. Hook (Jnr.)	3 January 1991	
4 January 1991	WO1 W.H. Steve Collins	31 December 1994	
4 January 1995	WO1 John A. Boulter PMM,MMM	31 December 1998	Pro Merito Medal PMM Military Merit Medal MMM
1 January 1999	WO1 J. Frik Krüger	31 December 2000	
1 January 2001	WO1 X.S. Siphunzi	11 July 2003	
11 July 2003	WO1 Jaques Niemand MMM	9 January 2005	Military Merit Medal MMM
10 January 2005	WO1 Percy E. Petersen	1 November 2008	
1 November 2008	MWO M.P. "Strambo" Mokoena	n.d	
n.d.	MWO J. Bernie van Zyl MMM	n.d	Military Merit Medal MMM
