= Permanent Force Good Service Medal =

- Type: Military long service medal
- Awarded for: 18 years of good service
- Country: South Africa
- Presented by: the State President
- Eligibility: Permanent Force, all ranks
- Clasps: 30 years of good service
- Status: Discontinued in 1975
- Established: 1961
- First award: 1961
- 18 Years and 30 Years service ribbon bars

SADF pre-1994 & SANDF post-2002 orders of wear
- Next (higher): SADF precedence: Union Medal; SANDF precedence: Union Medal
- Next (lower): SADF succession: John Chard Medal; SANDF succession: John Chard Medal
- Related: Union Medal

The Permanent Force Good Service Medal was instituted by the Republic of South Africa in 1961, when South Africa became a republic, to replace the Union Medal. It was awarded to Permanent Force members of the South African Defence Force for eighteen years of service and good conduct.

== The South African military ==
The Union Defence Forces (UDF) were established in 1912 and renamed the South African Defence Force (SADF) in 1958. On 27 April 1994, it was integrated with six other independent forces into the South African National Defence Force (SANDF).

== Institution ==
The Permanent Force Good Service Medal was instituted by the State President in 1961 when South Africa became a republic, to replace the Union Medal.

== Award criteria ==
The medal could be awarded to Permanent Force members of the South African Defence Force for eighteen years of good service. A clasp could be awarded after thirty years of service.

== Order of wear ==
With effect from 6 April 1952, when a new series of South African military decorations and medals was instituted to replace the hitherto used British and British Commonwealth decorations and medals, these new awards took precedence in the order of wear before all earlier British military orders, decorations and medals awarded to South Africans, with the exception of the Victoria Cross, which still took precedence before all other awards. The other older British awards continued to be worn in the order prescribed by the British Central Chancery of the Orders of Knighthood.

The position of the Permanent Force Good Service Medal in the official order of precedence was revised three times after 1975, to accommodate the inclusion or institution of new decorations and medals, first upon the integration into the South African National Defence Force on 27 April 1994, again when decorations and medals were belatedly instituted in April 1996 for the two former non-statutory forces, the Azanian People's Liberation Army and Umkhonto we Sizwe, and again when a new series of military orders, decorations and medals was instituted in South Africa on 27 April 2003. Its position remained unchanged upon all these occasions.

South African Defence Force until 26 April 1994

- Official SADF order of precedence:
  - Preceded by the Union Medal.
  - Succeeded by the John Chard Medal.
- Official national order of precedence. This national precedence was in error in respect of both the next higher and next lower medals as determined according to their dates of institution. The error was corrected by 1994.
  - Preceded by the Union Medal. (It should have been the Railway Police Good Service Medal of 1960.)
  - Succeeded by the Railway Police Good Service Medal of 1960. (It should have been the Police Medal for Faithful Service of 1963.)

South African National Defence Force from 27 April 1994

- Official SANDF order of precedence:
  - Preceded by the Union Medal of the Union of South Africa.
  - Succeeded by the John Chard Medal of the Republic of South Africa.
- Official national order of precedence:
  - Preceded by the Railway Police Good Service Medal of the Republic of South Africa.
  - Succeeded by the Police Medal for Faithful Service of the Republic of South Africa.

== Description ==
Obverse

The Permanent Force Good Service Medal is a medallion with a scalloped edge and a raised rim, 38 millimetres in diameter and 3 millimetres thick at the rim and struck in silver, depicting the pre-1994 South African Coat of Arms. The ribbon suspender is decorated with proteas and leaves.

Reverse

The reverse is inscribed "VIR LANGDURIGE DIENS EN GOEIE GEDRAG" and "FOR LONG SERVICE AND GOOD CONDUCT" and has a raised rim and decorated ribbon suspender, similar to those on the obverse. The medals and ribbon suspenders were minted separately and soldered together. The medal number was stamped or engraved at the bottom on the rim.

Clasp

The clasp, awarded after thirty years of service, was struck in silver and is 32 millimetres wide, with the South African Coat of Arms embellished in the centre and with a hole at each corner to enable it to be sewn to the ribbon. When ribbons only are worn, recipients of the clasp would wear a silver button on the ribbon bar, embellished with the South African Coat of Arms.

Ribbon

The ribbon is 32 millimetres wide, with three bands of orange, white and blue, repeated three times, the outer orange and blue bands each 4 millimetres wide and the seven inner bands all approximately 3½ millimetres wide. Orange, white and blue are the colours of the pre-1994 national flag. It is identical to the ribbon of the Union Medal.

== Discontinuation ==
Conferment of the Permanent Force Good Service Medal was discontinued in 1975, when it was replaced by a new set of three good service medals, the Good Service Medal, Gold, Good Service Medal, Silver and the Good Service Medal, Bronze.
