= South African Army Artillery Formation =

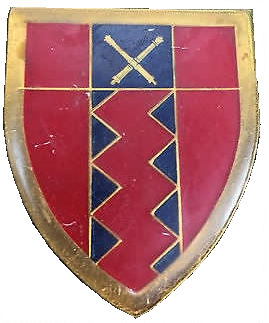
- SANDF Artillery Formation emblem
- Active: 1999 to date
- Country: South Africa
- Allegiance: South African Army
- Branch: South African Army
- Type: Artillery
- Size: Brigade size
- Part of: South African Army
- Garrison/HQ: Sebokeng Military Complex, Pretoria
- Nickname: The Gunners
- Patron: St Barbara
- Mottos: First in, last out
- Colors: Guardsmen Red and Oxford Blue
- Anniversaries: 1 April

Commanders
- General Officer Commanding (GOC): Brig Gen Jongile Maso
- General of the Gunners: Lt Gen Jabu Mbuli
- Chief of Staff (CoS): Col JK Moraka
- Notable commanders: Brig Boet Stapelberg; Brig Frans van den Berg; Brig Constand Viljoen; Col Koos Laubscher; Col Paul Lombard; Brig Gen Chris Roux; Brig Gen Abe Notshweleka; Brig Gen Deon Holtzhausen; Brig Gen Khaya Makina

Insignia
- Collar Badge: Bursting grenade with seven flames
- Beret Colour: Oxford Blue
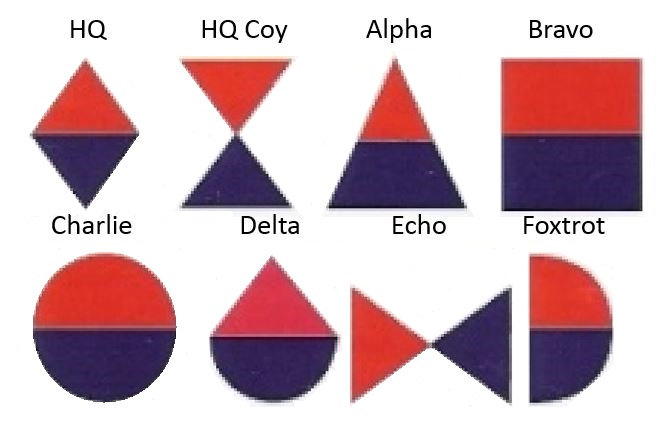
- Artillery Battery Emblems

- Artillery Beret Bar circa 1992

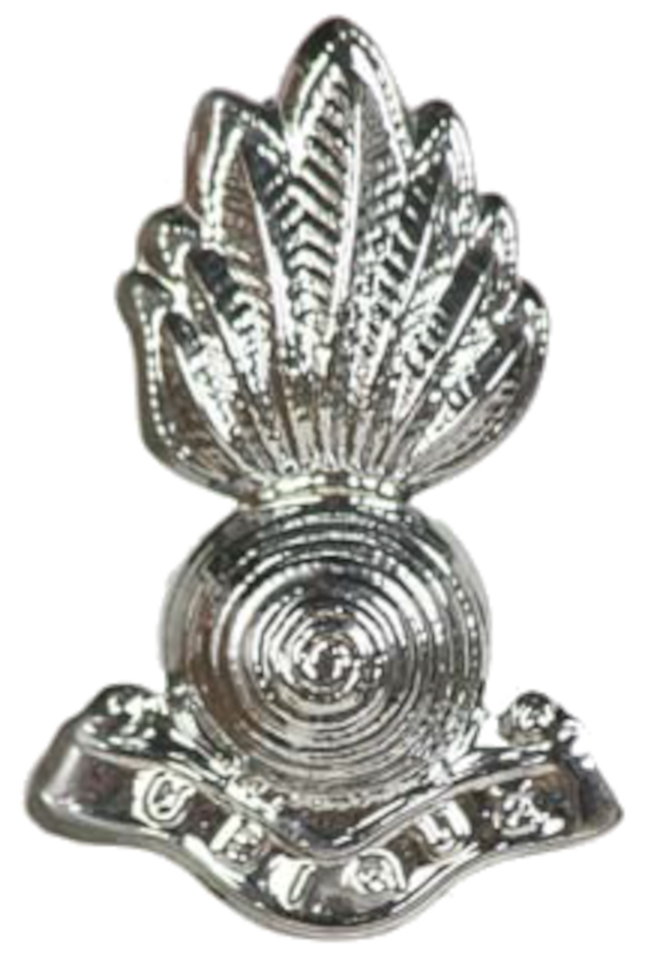
- Branch of Service

The South African Army Artillery Formation is the controlling entity of all South African Army artillery units. It draws much of its history from the South African Artillery, established in 1934 but with roots that reach back to 1921. The formation consists of both regular and reserve units. There is a separate South African Army Air Defence Artillery Formation that directs army anti-aircraft warfare units.

== History ==
=== Origins ===
The South African Permanent Force, created in 1913 as the Permanent Force and re-designated with effect from 23 February 1923, included the South African Field Artillery (SAFA), and the South African Permanent Garrison Artillery (SAPGA). The SAPGA had begun operations some time before, when the coastal defences of the Cape Peninsula (manned by the Cape Garrison Artillery) had been handed over to South Africa in December 1921.

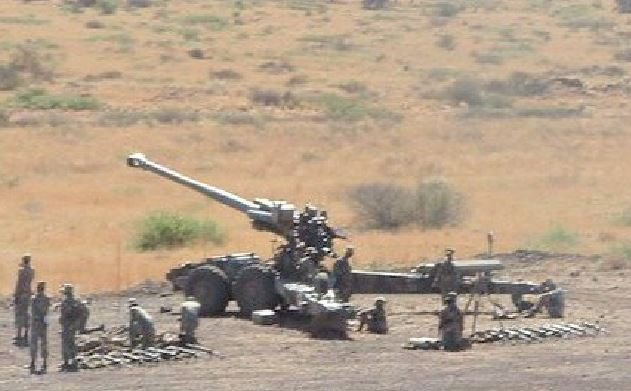
SANDF G5 artillery Lohatla

In Proclamation No. 246 of 1934, the Governor General of the Union of South Africa merged the two organisations with effect from 1 September 1934 and created one Corps titled the South African Artillery (SAA) (see South African Army corps and branches).

=== World War II ===
Nine field regiments, two medium regiments, and three anti-tank regiments served in North Africa and Italy during the Second World War.

1st Medium Regiment SAA (SAHA) was formed briefly from 1 October 1939 - July 1941, when it was broken up in Egypt to provide replacements for the field regiments of the SAA. It was reformed with headquarters at Cape Town from 1 January 1946. It was transferred from Cape Town and out of Cape Command to Oudtshoorn from 31 December 1953, but was then disbanded after a Citizen Force reorganisation on 1 March 1960.

=== Post World War II ===
From 1 July 1951 8 Field Regiment SAA was active, but was redesignated the Johannesburg Regiment in 1960.

=== Bush War period ===
10 Artillery Brigade South Africa, was active with 4 and 14 Regiments since 1983, and 14 Artillery Regiment disbanded on January 1, 1993.

=== National Defence Force Reorganisation ===
The army's reorganisation after the creation of the new South African National Defence Force was lengthy. The SA Army Office was established. The Corps were restructured with Regular and Reserve Regiments under command. The so-called "Type Formations" were established which assumed responsibility for the provisioning of combat-ready forces to be employed under the direction of Joint Operations Division.

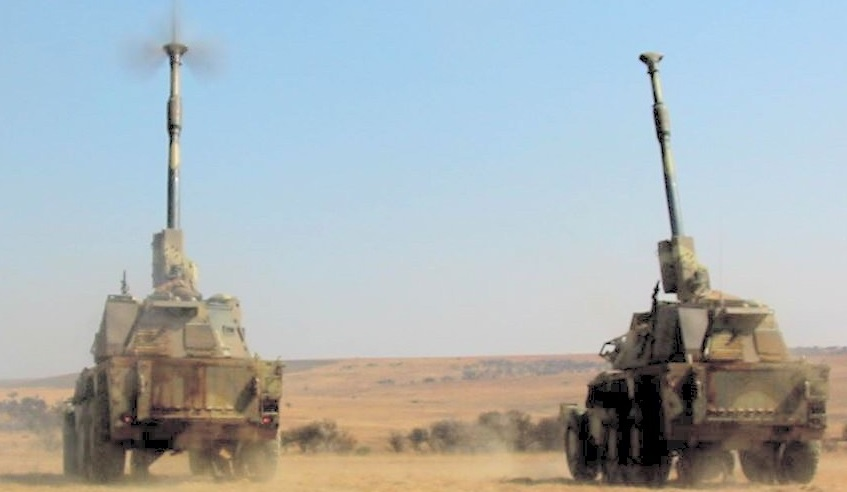
G6 Rhino Howitzers at the Klipdrift military base

==== Air Defence Artillery becomes a separate formation ====
- In 1997 the 7th Light Anti-Aircraft Regiment, active since the 1960s, was disestablished.
- Regiment Overvaal (ROV) which was established on 1 April 1969 as an Anti-Aircraft Regiment based on Vereeniging Military Base in Vereeniging. P Battery of Regiment Vaalrivier was transferred on 1 October 1969 to form 8th Light Anti-Aircraft Regiment (8LLA). The name changed from 8LLA to ROV on 27 April 1993. The regiment was disestablished in 1997.

==== The Artillery Formation ====
The South African Artillery re-organised itself into the South African Army Artillery Formation, directed by the SA Army Artillery Formation Headquarters. The South African Army Artillery Formation HQ was established in April 1999.

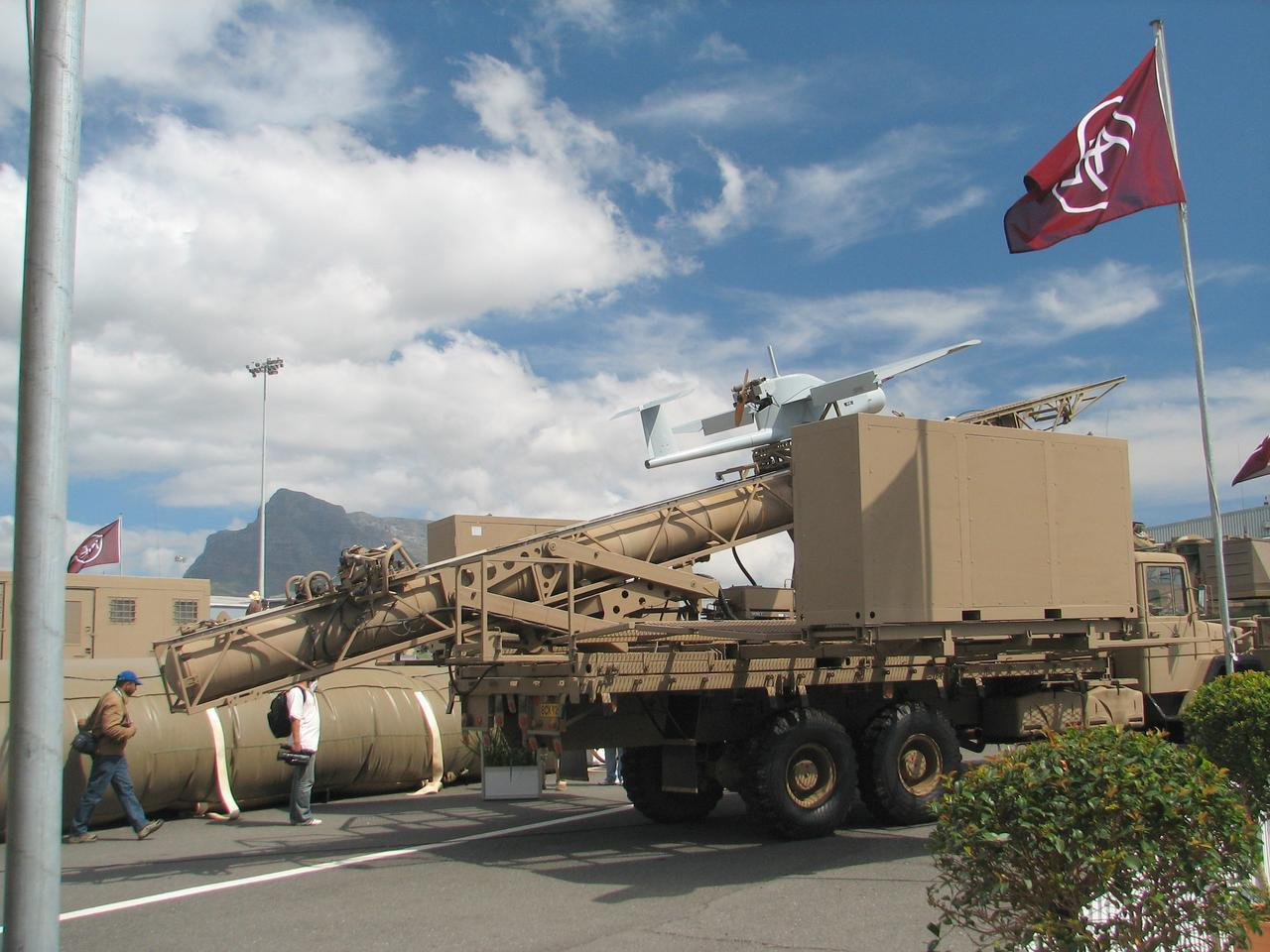
SAMIL 100 carrying a Vulture UAV.

The GOC Artillery Formation is responsible for managing the appointment of Master Gunners of the Artillery.

=== Regional Co-operation ===
In the annual report for the 2013-14 fiscal year, the SANDF reported the development of artillery cooperation and the establishment of the Namibian Army School of Artillery. The SA Army assisted the Namibian Defence Force with the development of courses and ultimately the establishment of the Namibian School of Artillery.

=== Qualification and Appointment insignia ===
General of the Gunners (Post)
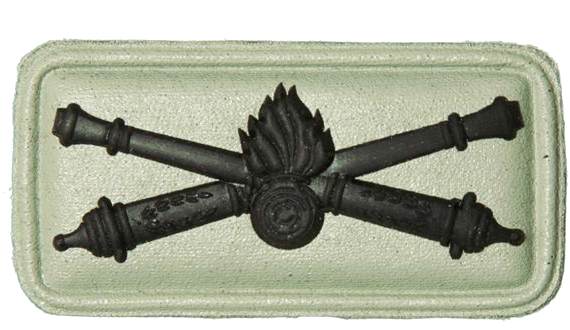
Black on Thatch beige, Embossed. Crossed gun barrels with grenade

Master Gunner Badge (Qualification and Decoration)
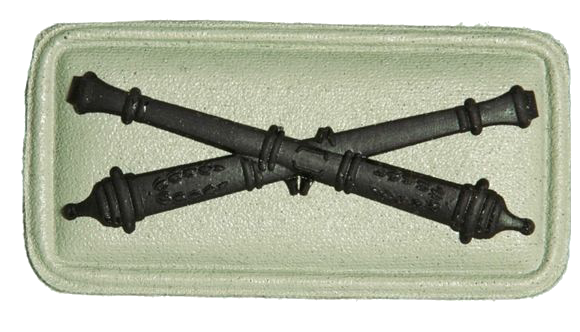
Black on Thatch beige, Embossed. Crossed gun barrels

Artillery No 1 (Qualification)
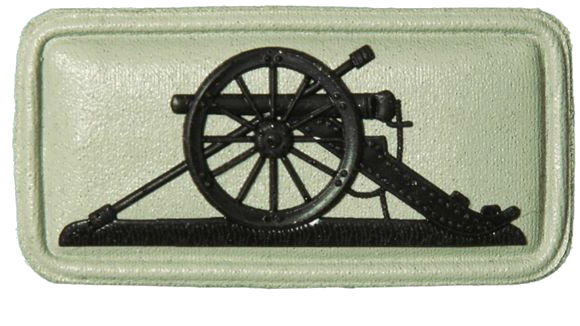
Black on Thatch beige, Embossed. Gun image

== Regular units ==
- School of Artillery
- 4 Artillery Regiment (Composite Regiment) (Potchefstroom)
- Artillery Mobilisation Regiment

== Reserve units ==
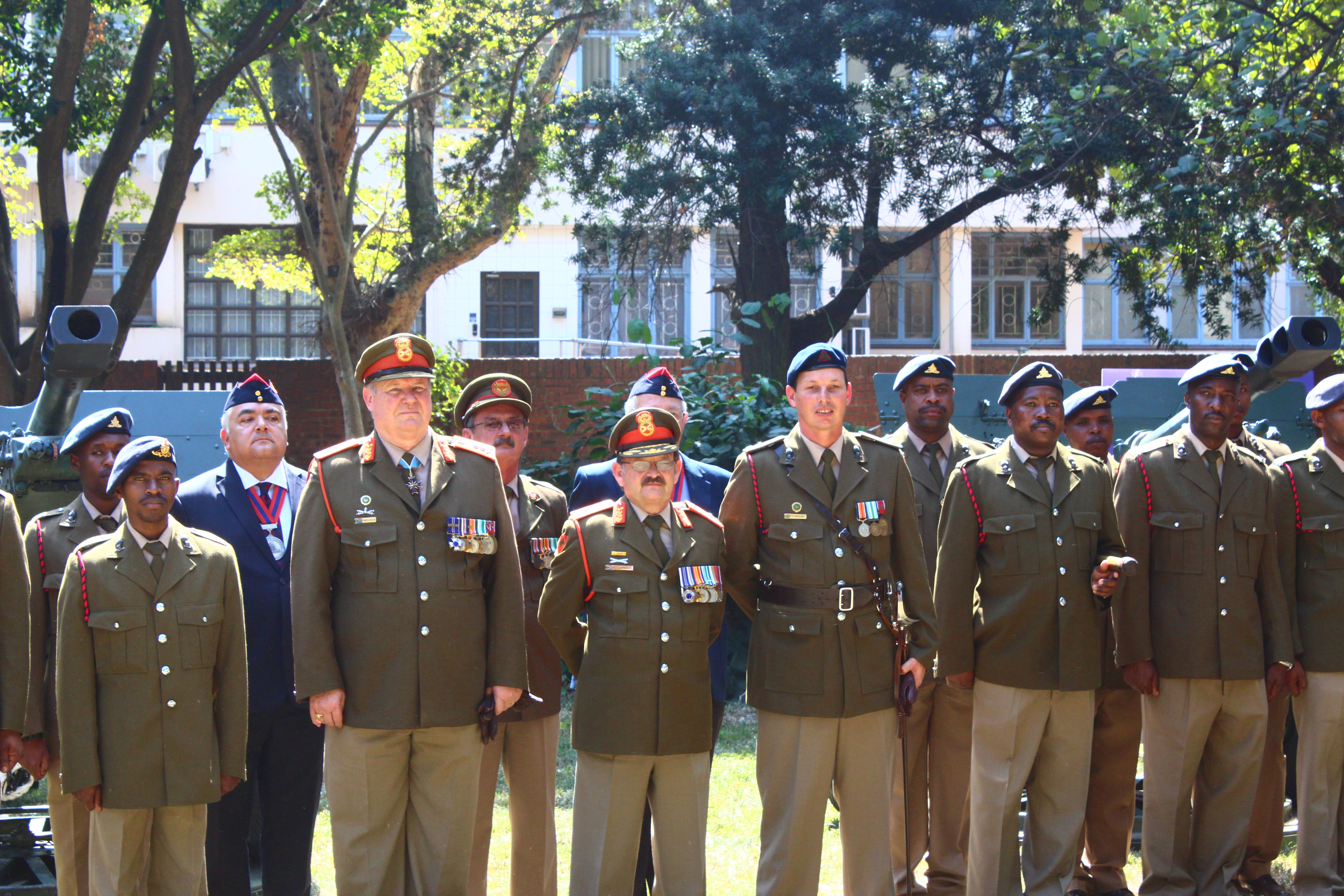
Maj Gen Roy Andersen with the GOC, Brig Gen Deon Holtzhausen, and Sgt Maj of the Formation accompanied by the NFA OC, Major Craig Nel, just after the NFA gunners fired the salute at the Gunner's Memorial Service in Durban 2014

- Nelson Mandela Artillery Regiment - equipped with G5 155 mm towed howitzers, Cape Town
- General Dan Pienaar Artillery Regiment - equipped with G5 155 mm towed howitzers, Kroonstad
- King Cetshwayo Artillery Regiment - equipped with G6 155 mm self-propelled howitzers, Durban
- Sandfontein Artillery Regiment - equipped with G6 155 mm self-propelled howitzers, Johannesburg
- State Artillery Regiment - equipped with Bateleur 127 mm MLRS, Pretoria
- Regiment Potchefstroom Universiteit - equipped with Bateleur 127 mm MLRS, Potchefstroom
- Steve Biko Artillery Regiment - equipped with 120 mm mortars, Pretoria (Airborne unit that supports 44 Parachute Regiment)

== Equipment ==
The Formation uses the following equipment, among others:

- GV6 155 mm self-propelled howitzer (43)
- GV5 155 mm howitzer (75) replaced the G4 155 mm gun and the G2 140 mm gun
- Bateleur 127 mm 40 tube self-propelled multiple rocket launcher (25)
- 1 Battery of ATE Vulture Tactical Unmanned Air Vehicles for daytime reconnaissance and artillery spotting
- M5 120 mm air deployable mortar

To be acquired:

- G7 lightweight 105 mm gun still under development by Denel Land Systems

=== Conventional Artillery ===
==== Cannon ====
Variant	Description	Comment	Image
G1 Gun Quick Firing	25-pounder, high explosive, anti tank and smoke shells	United Kingdom design	SANDF G1 Cannon
G2 Gun Breach Loading	5.5 inch medium gun, high explosive	United Kingdom design	SANDF G2 Cannon
G4 Gun Breach Loading	155mm, high explosive	Israel design, stopgap until the G5 cannon entered service	SANDF G4 Cannon
G5 Gun/Howitzer	155mm, high explosive, Samil 100 Gun tractor	South Africa design	G5 with Samil 100 Gun tractor
G6 Gun/Howitzer	155mm, high explosive, Self driven	South Africa design	SANDF G6 Rhino
Vulture UAV	Vulture Forward Observation	South Africa design. Used for target acquisition, fall-of-shot detection and fire correction in support of Towed and Self Propelled Gun Howitzer Systems.	Vulture Launcher Samil 100

==== Multiple Rocket Launcher Systems ====
Variant	Description	Comment	Image
Valkiri MLRS	127 mm rocket MLRS	South Africa design Unimog chassis, pre fragmented warhead, 24 launch tubes	Valkiri multiple rocket launcher system
Bateleur MLRS	127 mm rocket MLRS	South Africa design Kwevoel chassis, pre fragmented warhead, 40 launch tubes	Bateleur Multiple Rocket Launcher
