= 71 Motorised Brigade (South Africa) =

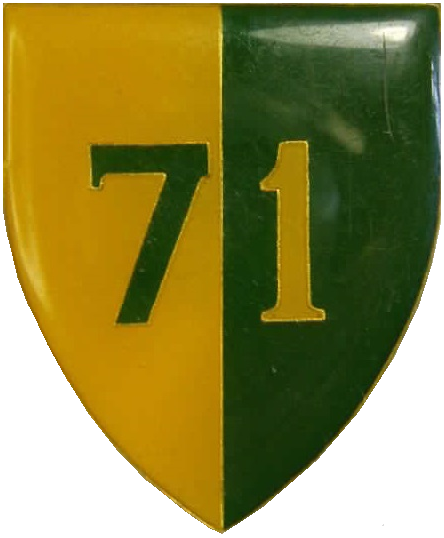
- 71 Motorised Brigade emblem
- Active: 1974–1992
- Country: South Africa
- Allegiance: South Africa
- Branch: South African Army
- Type: Motorised Brigade
- Part of: South African Composite Brigade
- Garrison: Cape Town
- Nickname: 71 Mot
- Equipment: Ratel; Eland Mk7 90mm and 60mm Armoured Cars; Rooikat; Buffel; G2 howitzer
- Engagements: South African Border War

Insignia
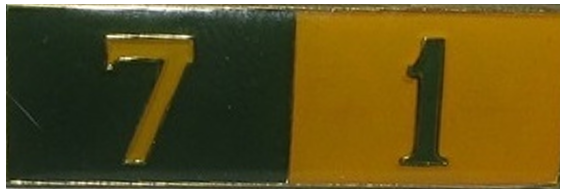
- 71 Mot Brigade Command Bar

71 Motorised Brigade was a formation of 7th South African Infantry Division, a combined arms force consisting of infantry, armour and artillery.

== History ==
=== Origin ===
==== 17 Brigade ====
71 Brigade can trace its origins back to a structure in the late 1960s, called 17 Brigade, which was headquartered in Cape Town. 17 Brigade was housed in the Castle with Western Province Command. On 1 August 1974, through a reorganization of the Army's conventional force, the name was changed to 71 Motorised Brigade.

==== Initial Structure ====
Under this reorganisation, the following units were transferred from Western Province Command to the new command:

- Cape Field Artillery,
- Cape Town Highlanders,
- Regiment Westelike Provinsie,
- Regiment Boland,
- Regiment Oranjerivier,
- 3 Field Squadron,
- 74 Signal Squadron,
- 3 Maintenance Unit,
- 30 Field Workshop and
- 3 Field Ambulance.

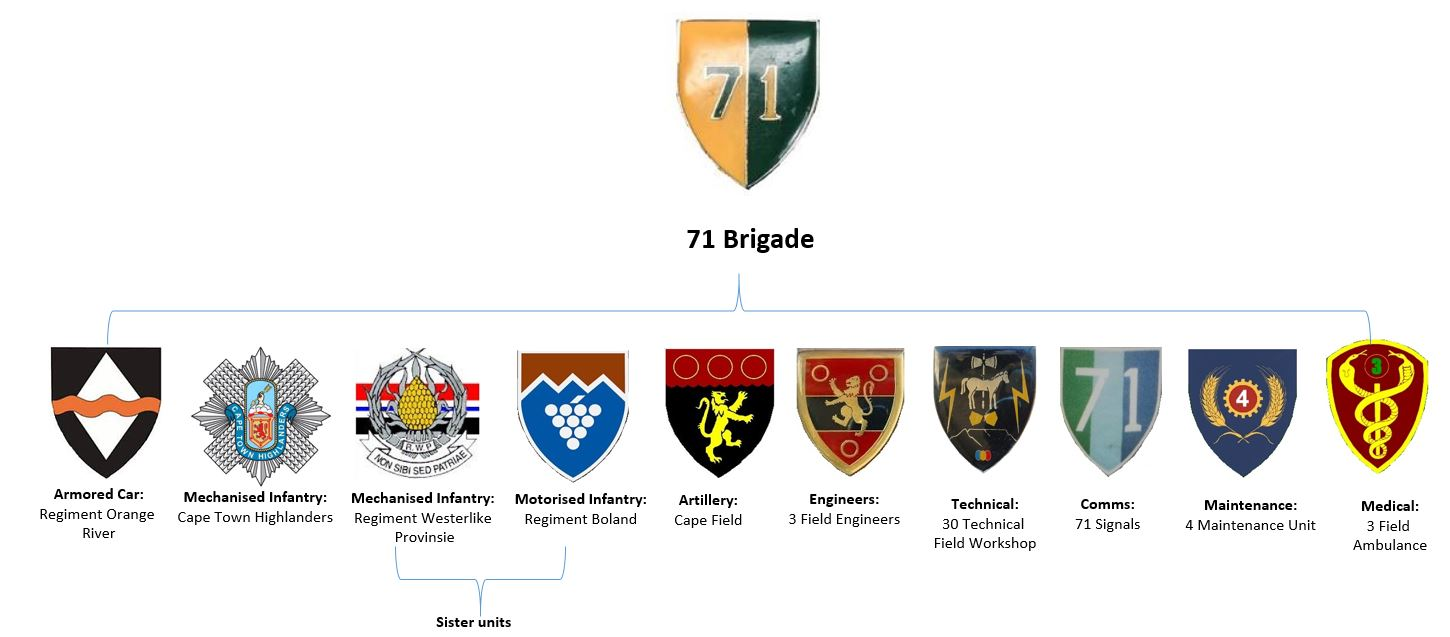
SADF 7 Division 71 Brigade associated units

==== Higher Command ====
71 Motorised Brigade then resorted under the new 7 Division.

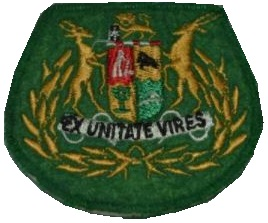
SADF era Brigade level Sergeant Major insignia

==== Changes over time ====
71 Motorised Brigade structure was not static, units were substituted as needs were adapted to. The increased use of armour in the Border War necessitated a decision for each brigade to have a tank capability. Prince Alfred's Guard was nominated to be 71 Motorised Brigade's tank regiment and was transferred from Eastern Province Command to 71 Motorised Brigade on 1 April 1989.

=== Brigade Training and Exercises ===
71 Motorised Brigade would generally make use of the General de Wet Training Range, Tempe, near Bloemfontein. Notably 71 Motorised Brigade was involved in Exercise Thunder Chariot, a Divisional exercise held since 1956, at the Army Battle School. Other exercises included:

- Exercise Sweepslag III
- Exercise Lightning

71 Motorised Brigade also made use of the Apostle Battery on the mountain slopes above Llandudno, near Hout Bay.

=== Operational Activation ===
As a Citizen Force structure, 71 Motorised Brigade would make use of call-up orders for its personnel to generally report for 3 months service. Headquarters staff would then leave for Tempe near Bloemfontein, where a transfer camp would be established to process troops en route to the operational area in northern South West Africa. Processing of units would include personal documentation, a medical examination, inoculation and the issuing of equipment and weapons. Each unit on completion of the necessary processing, would entrain to the Olienhoutplaat Station for a six-day journey to Grootfontein, the railhead near the Operational Area. By 1980 however, 71 Motorised Brigade's headquarters had moved from Tempe to the Army Battle School.

=== South West Africa and Angola ===
71 Motorised Brigade provided reinforcements to Sector 10 during September and October 1988, with "Operation Prone" these included a HQ, a mechanised combat group, a workshop unit and elements of the Brigade's signals and maintenance units.

=== Restructured as 9 Division ===
71 Motorised Brigade ceased to exist on 31 December 1991, and was incorporated in its entirety into the new 9 South African Division on 1 January 1992. Essentially 71 Motorised Brigade would be enlarged and transformed into the new Division, retaining its headquarters in Cape Town.

==== Newcomers ====
The new Division officially acquired Regiment Simonsberg, Cape Garrison Artillery and 7 Light Anti-Aircraft Regiment under its command on 10, 11 and 12 June. These units were followed on 22 and 23 October by Regiment President Steyn, a tank Regiment and Regiment Groot Karoo. 12 Provost Company was due to fall under command on 1 January 1992, on which date they would be redesignated 9 Provost Company. The Division now had 19 units under its command and was now affiliated to 3 Medical Battalion Group as well.

== Insignia ==
The first shoulder badge to be worn by 71 Motorised Brigade headquarters personnel was approved on 15 March 1978. 71 Motorised Brigade's flag was a springbok in green and old gold and had been approved on 28 July 1988 In October 1988, the Brigade's beret badge was also approved.

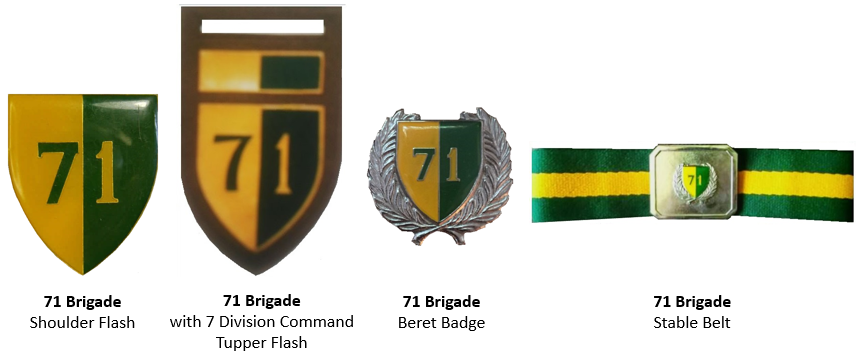
SADF era 71 Brigade insignia

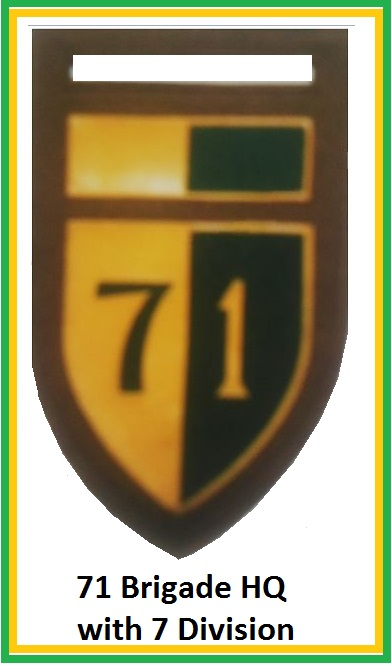
SADF 7 Division 71 Brigade HQ Flash

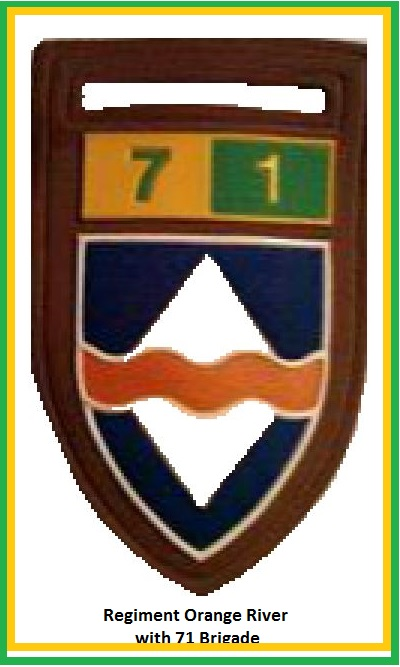
SADF 7 Division 71 Brigade Regiment Orange River Flash

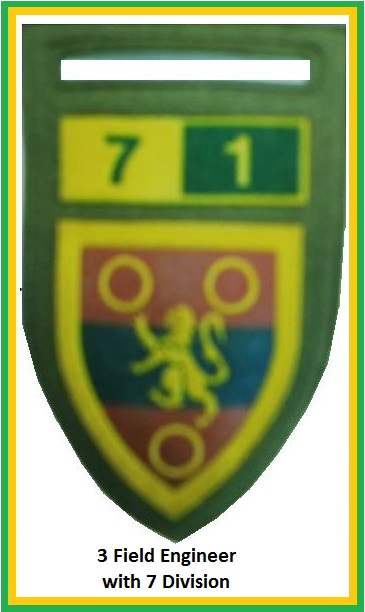
SADF 7 Division 71 Brigade 3 Field Engineer Flash

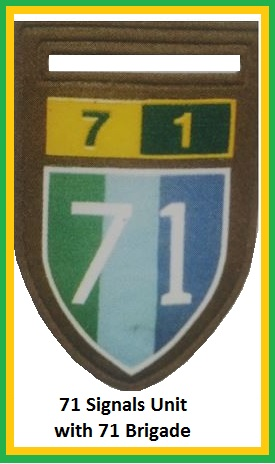
SADF 7 Division 71 Brigade Signals Unit Flash

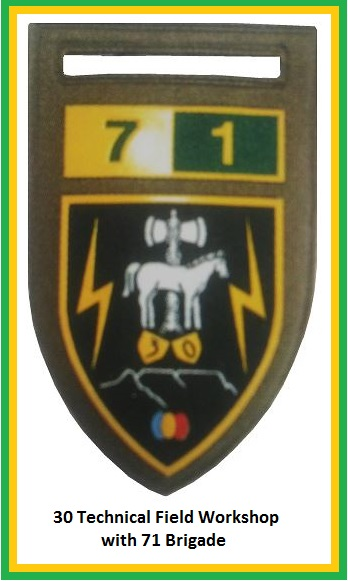
SADF 7 Division 71 Brigade 30 Technical Field Workshop Flash

== Leadership ==
Leadership
From	Officer Commanding	To	Ribbon
1974	Brig G.E. McLouglin	1975	
1975	Col W.J. Kempen	1980	
1980	Col A.K. De Jager	1981	
1982	Col P.R. Lloyd	1987	
1987	Col G.P.M. McLoughlin	1992	
