= Blaauwberg Armoured Regiment =

Regiment Noordwes-Kaap Regiment Hertzog Regiment Oranjerivier Blaauwberg Armoured Regiment
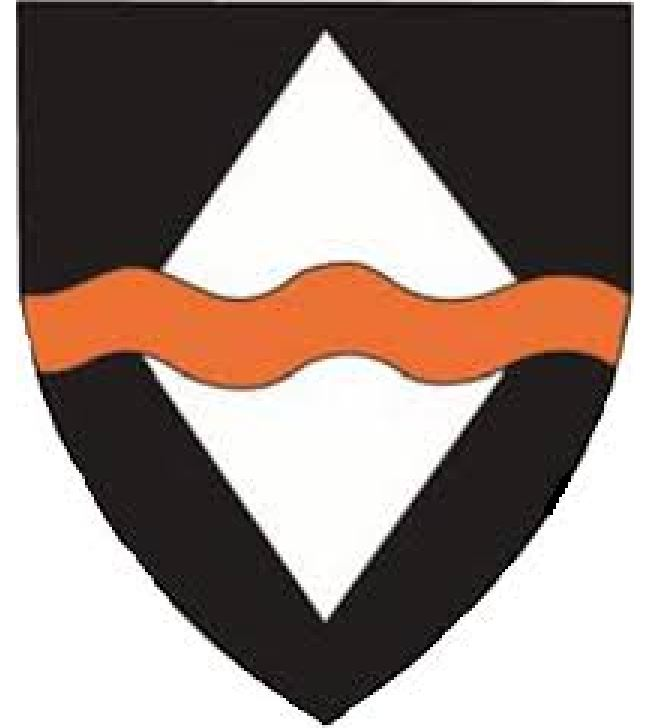
- SANDF Regiment Orange River emblem
- Active: 1 July 1952 to present
- Country: South Africa
- Allegiance: Republic of South Africa; Republic of South Africa
- Branch: South African Army; South African Army
- Type: Armoured Car Regiment
- Size: One Battalion
- Part of: South African Army Armoured Formation; Army Conventional Reserve
- Garrison/HQ: Cape Town; Fort iKapa
- Mottos: Occuli et Auris (Eyes & Ears)
- Anniversaries: 1 July (Regimental Day)
- Equipment: MklV Marmon Harrington armoured car, Ferret scout car, Rooikat armoured fighting vehicle

Insignia
- Beret Colour: Black
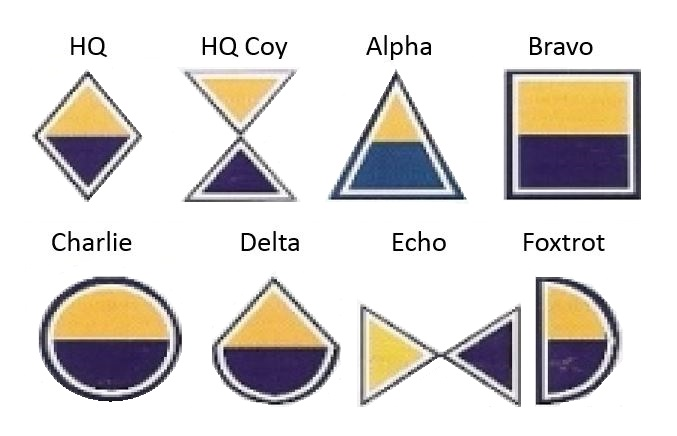
- Armour Squadron emblems

- Armour beret bar circa 1992
- Abbreviation: BAR

The Blaauwberg Armoured Regiment (formerly Regiment Oranjerivier) is a reserve armoured regiment of the South African Army.

== History ==
=== Origin ===
The Regiment was founded as an Afrikaans language unit on 1 July 1952 as Regiment Noordwes-Kaap ("Regiment North-West Cape"), but this name was changed in the same year to Regiment Hertzog.

=== Citizen Force Unit ===
Due to a reorganisation of the Citizen Force the unit was redesignated Regiment Oranjerivier (Regiment Orangerivier) on 1 January 1960. At this time the unit was part of 17 Brigade.

In 1961 after considerable discussion a regimental motto, Occuli Et Auris ("Eyes and Ears") was officially adopted. This motto was inspired by the eagles that hunt over the Kalahari Desert.

=== Equipment Upgrade ===
In the early 1970s the regiment's Marmon-Herrington Armoured Cars were replaced by the far more versatile and effective Eland 60.

=== Border War ===
==== Under 7 South African Infantry Division ====
Regiment Oranjerivier became the armoured car regiment of 71 Motorised Brigade (part of 7 South African Infantry Division) on 15 November 1974. A year later the headquarters of the regiment was moved to Cape Town.

The regiment was mobilized together with most other the other units of 71 Brigade to serve in Southern Angola during Operation Savannah. Sub-units of the ROR were located from Katima Mulilo in the east to Chitado in the west. Members of one of these sub-units were the first South African Citizen Force troops to make contact with a conventionally deployed foreign battle group when they were fired on by a Russian T-54 tank at Cahama in March 1976. During the same period the unit lost its first member ever to enemy fire.

The regiment went on to serve several more times on the South-West Africa/Namibia border as well as inside Angola. This included Operation Prone in Southern Angola during August/October 1988, where the regiment used a large number of Ratel 90 infantry fighting vehicles.

On 2 November 1990, the ROR was awarded the Rooikat Floating Trophy - the first time the trophy had been awarded - as the best unit in the South African Armoured Corps. In November 1991 the regiment moved to Wingfield and gained an independent unit HQ with their own facilities, separated by some distance from that of 71 Brigade headquarters.

==== Under 9 South African Infantry Division ====
Sometime since 1974 regimental headquarters appears to have moved to Cape Town. The regiment appears to have been transferred with much of the rest of 71 Motorised Brigade to * 9 South African Infantry Division on the brigade's upgrading to a division on 2 January 1992.

=== Under the SANDF ===
9 S.A. Infantry Division was disbanded in 1997, and ROR transferred to the new armoured 'type' formation, the South African Army Armoured Formation. The regiment currently uses the Rooikat armoured fighting vehicle, equipped with a 76 mm quick-fire gun.

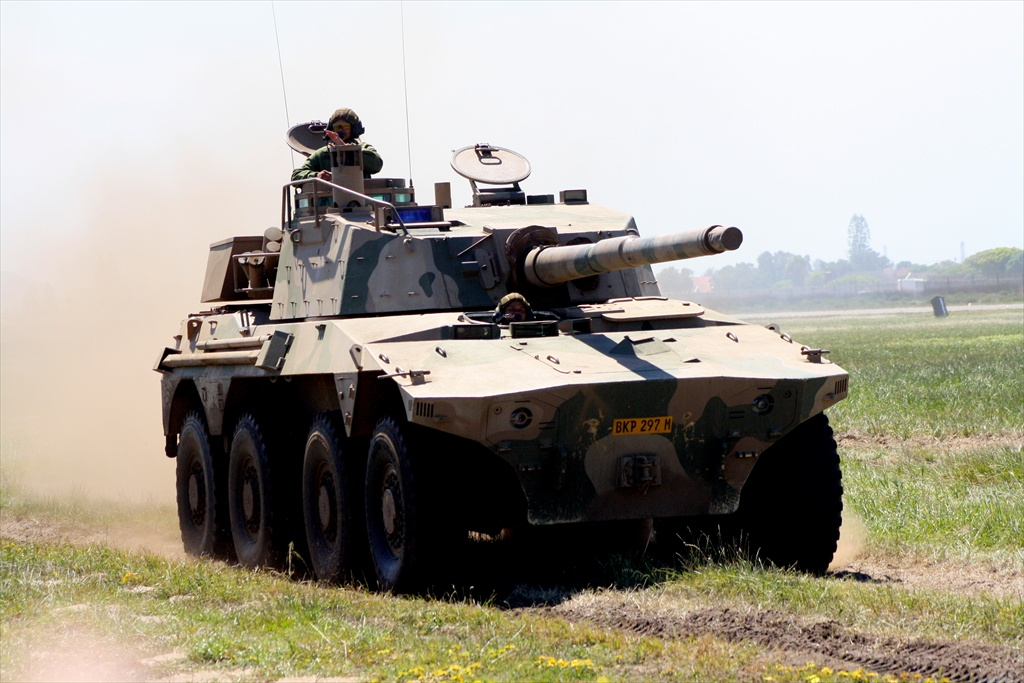
Rooikat 76mm Armoured Car

==== Name Change ====
In August 2019, 52 Reserve Force units had their names changed to reflect the diverse military history of South Africa. Regiment Oranjerivier became the Blaauwberg Armoured Regiment, and have 3 years to design and implement new regimental insignia.

== Regimental Symbols ==
- Regimental badge: An eagle with outspread wings with the regimental motto beneath. The badge is worn on the traditional Armoured Corps black beret.
- The Regiment received the Freedom of Upington on 4 May 1966 and the Freedom of Keimoes on 11 June 1968.
- The symbol of command of the Regiment's Commanding Officer is a silvered 90mm practice round.

=== Previous Dress Insignia ===
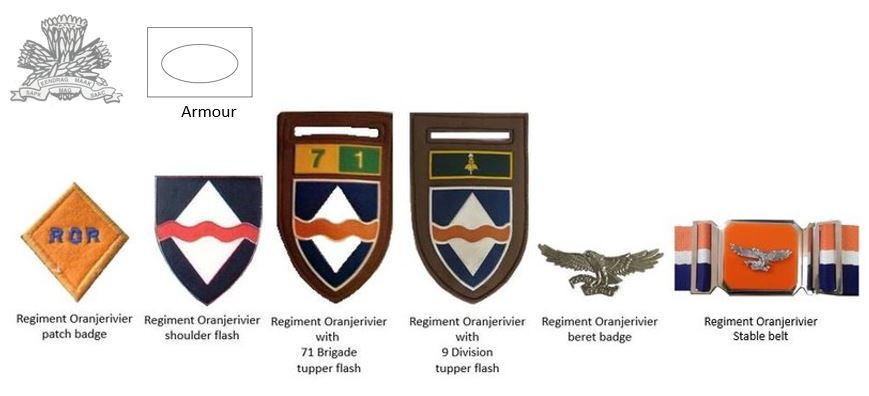
SADF era Regiment Oranjerivier insignia

== Leadership ==
Leadership
From	Honorary Colonel	To	Ribbon
	No known incumbents		
From	Commanding Officers	To	Ribbon
1952	Cmdt M.N. Slabber	1956	
1956	Cmdt J.A.B. Strauss	1967	
1967	Cmdt M.D. Radford	1968	
1968	Cmdt G. van Rooyen JCD	1975	John Chard Decoration JCD
1975	Cmdt J. Lourens JCD	1980	John Chard Decoration JCD
1980	Cmdt H.A.C. Bremer JCD	1983	John Chard Decoration JCD
1984	Cmdt J. Maltez JCD	1989	John Chard Decoration JCD
1989	Lt Col C.G. van Zyl JCD	1996	John Chard Decoration JCD
1996	Lt Col W.A. Rall JCD	2003	John Chard Decoration JCD
2003	Lt Col H.M. Matthee	2005	
2005	Lt Col W.A. Rall JCD	2009	John Chard Decoration JCD
2009	Lt Col J.S. Olivier	13 February 2015	
14 February 2015	Lt Col J.P. Wessels	Present	
From	Regimental Sergeants Major	To	Ribbon
	No known incumbents		

== Freedom of Entry ==
- 4 May 1966 - Upington
- 11 June 1968 - Keimoes
