= David Graaff =

David Graaff is the name of:

- Sir David Graaff, 1st Baronet (1859–1931), South African merchant and politician
- Sir David Graaff, 3rd Baronet (1940–2015), South African winery owner, grandson of the first baronet
