= 9 South African Infantry Division =

9 South African Division
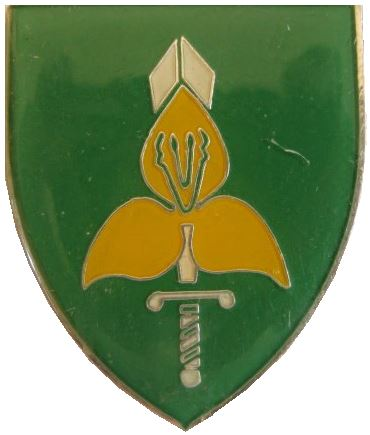
- 9th Division emblem
- Active: 1992-1997
- Country: South Africa
- Branch: South African Army
- Type: Infantry
- Size: Division

Insignia
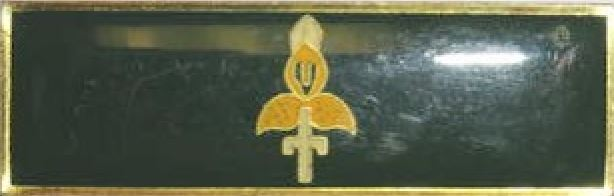
- 9 Division Command Bar

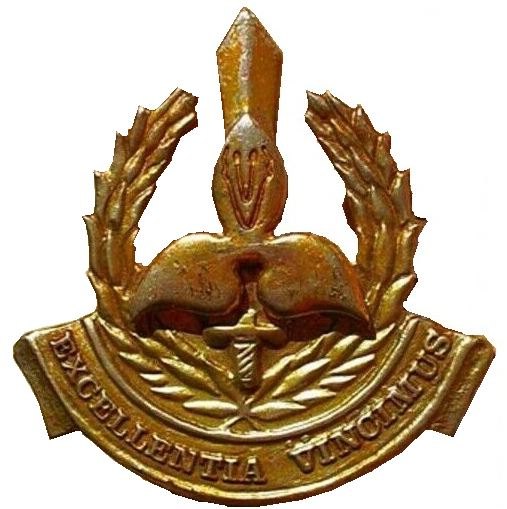
- 9 Division Beret badge

9 South African Infantry Division was a formation of the South African Army, active in the early 1990s.

== History ==
9 SA Infantry Division was established in 1992 in Cape Town when the SA Army abandoned the conventional order of battle used for field divisions. 9 SA Infantry Division was a balanced mix of all the arms and services required in modern conventional warfare with the accent on long-range mobility and great fire-power.

=== 71 Brigade Restructured as 9 Division ===
The rationalisation of the SADF in the early 1990s resulted in its brigades being redesigned into three compact mobile conventional Divisions.

71 Motorised Brigade ceased to exist on 31 December 1991, and was incorporated in its entirety into the new 9 South African Infantry Division on 1 January 1992. Essentially 71 Motorised Brigade would be enlarged and transformed into the new Division, with its headquarters in Cape Town.

==== Newcomers ====
The new Division officially acquired Regiment Simonsberg, Cape Garrison Artillery and 7 Light Anti-Aircraft Regiment under its command on 10, 11 and 12 June.

These units were followed on 22 and 23 October by Regiment President Steyn, a tank regiment and Regiment Groot Karoo, a mechanised infantry battalion. 12 Provost Company was due to fall under this command on 1 January 1992, on which date they would be redesignated 9 Provost Company.

The Division now had 19 units under its command and was now affiliated to 3 Medical Battalion Group as well.

9 SA Division typically had:

- Armoured car regiments.
- Motorised infantry battalions transported in 'Buffels'.
- Three artillery regiments equipped with G5 or G6 or the 140mm (5.5 inch) howitzers.
- Two anti-aircraft regiments armed with a combination of 20mm and 35mm towed artillery. In 9 Division's case, Cape Garrison Artillery(35mm) and 7 Light Anti-Aircraft Regiment(20mm).
- An engineer regiment.
- Necessary supporting service units.

==== Headquarters ====
In 1992 the Division's headquarters was at the Castle, and in December 1992 it relocated to Noordkamp Monte Vista.

=== Exercises ===
9 Division's first formation exercise "Genesis" was held at the Army Battle School from 6 to 17 June 1992 and was attended by the leader element of the Division.

Certain 9 SA Division units were also deployed in the counter-insurgency (COIN) role during 1992 and 1993.

=== Leadership ===
Leadership
From	Officer Commanding	To	Ribbon
nd	Brig M.S. du Toit	nd	
nd	Col P. Genis	nd	
From	Regimental Sergeants Major	To	Ribbon
nd	WO1 S J Joubert	nd	

==== Insignia ====
The new Division's Formation emblem was unique. The Cape Yellow Disa is very scarce and is found in only two locations on the upper regions of Table Mountain and Fonteintjiesberg in the Worcester region.

The Disa symbolises excellence which complements the Divisions Motto "Excellentia Vincimus" which means "Through Excellence we shall Conquer" The sword also symbolises the competence and alertness of the Division, but is also a sword of peace. The green and gold colours signifies the traditional Springbok colour scheme.

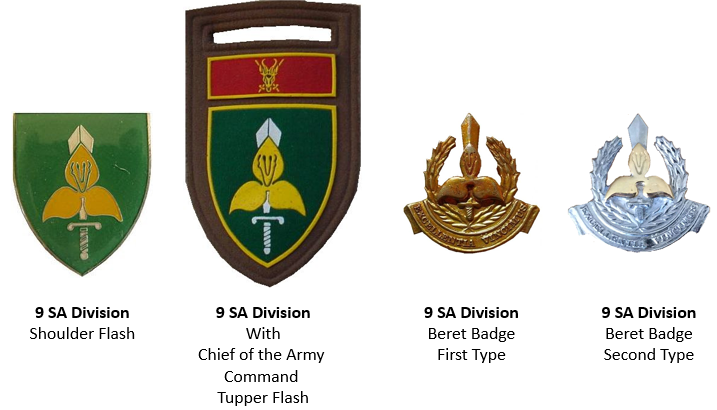
SADF era 9 SA Division insignia

The Division held its Colours Parade on 20 November 1993 at the Youngsfield Military Base.

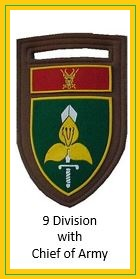
9 Division under Chief of Army Command Flash

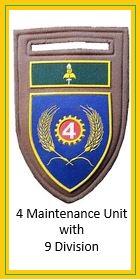
4 Maintenance Unit with 9 Division Flash

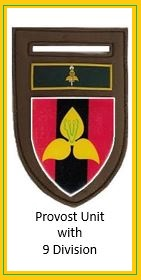
9 Division Provost Unit Flash

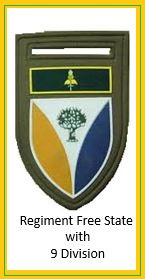
Regiment Free State with 9 Division Flash

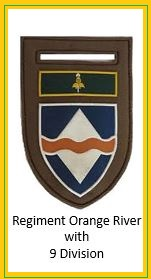
Regiment Orange River with 9 Division Flash

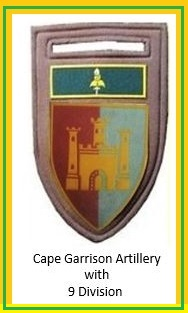
SANDF 9 Division Cape Garrison Artillery tupper flash

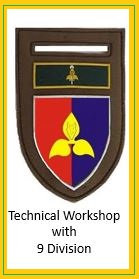
9 Division Technical Workshop Flash

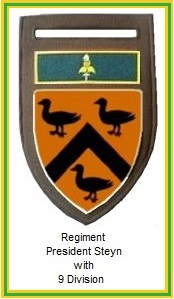
9 Division Regiment President Steyn Flash

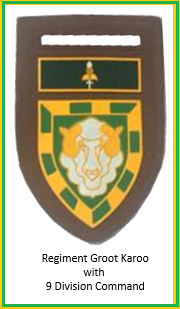
9 Division Regiment Groot Karoo Flash

=== Disbandment ===
The Division was effectively disbanded on April 1, 1997, when its former units became part of 7th South African Infantry Division as 75 Brigade.

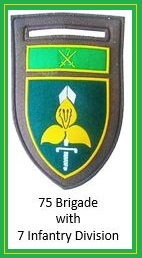
SANDF era 75 Brigade with 7 Infantry Division tupper flash

== Insignia ==
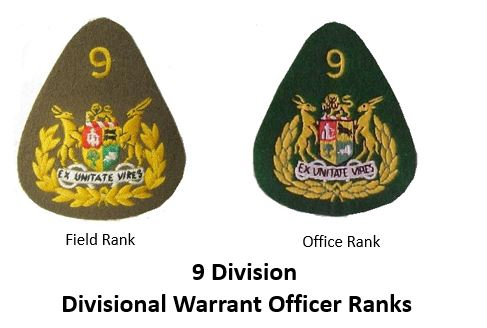
SADF 9 Division Warrant Officer Insignia
