= 72 Motorised Brigade (South Africa) =

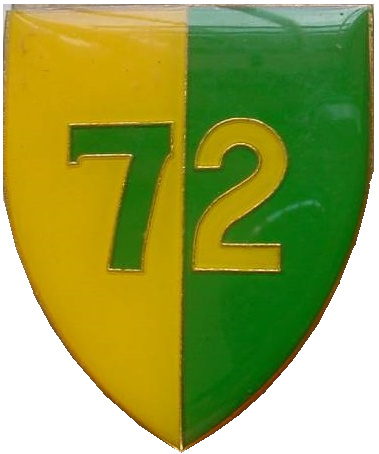
- 72 Motorised Brigade emblem
- Active: 1974–1992
- Country: South Africa
- Allegiance: South Africa
- Branch: South African Army
- Type: Motorised Brigade
- Part of: South African Composite Brigade
- Garrison: Kensington
- Nickname: 72 Mot
- Equipment: Ratel; Eland Mk7 90mm and 60mm Armoured Cars; Buffel; G2
- Engagements: South African Border War

Insignia
- 72 Mot Brigade Command Bar

72 Motorised Brigade was a Formation of 7th Infantry Division (South Africa), a combined arms force consisting of infantry, armour and artillery.

== History ==
=== Origin ===
==== 18 Brigade ====
72 Brigade can trace its origins back to a structure in the late 1960s, called 18 Brigade, which was headquartered in Kensington. On 1 August 1974, through a reorganization of the Army’s conventional force, the name was changed to 72 Motorised Brigade.

==== Initial Structure ====
Under this reorganisation, the following units were transferred from Witwatersrand Command to the new command:

- Transvaal Scottish Regiment, 1st Battalion
- South African Irish Regiment,
- Johannesburg Regiment,
- 1 Light Horse Regiment,
- Transvaal Horse Artillery,
- 12 Field Squadron,
- 72 Signal Squadron,
- 7 Maintenance Unit,
- 31 Field Workshop and
- 5 Field Ambulance.

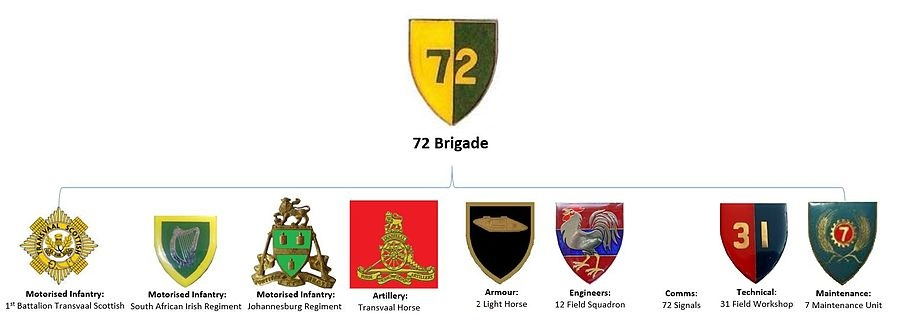
SADF 7 Division 72 Brigade associated units

==== Higher Command ====
During its period 72 Motorised Brigade resorted at different stages under the 7 and 8 Divisions.

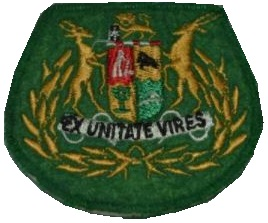
SADF era Brigade level Sergeant Major insignia

=== Brigade Training and Exercises ===
72 Motorised Brigade would generally make use of the General de Wet Training Range, Tempe, near Bloemfontein. Notably 72 Motorised Brigade was involved in Exercise Thunder Chariot, a Divisional exercise held since 1956, at the Army Battle School. Other exercises included:

- Exercise de Wet 2 in April and May 1975
- Exercise Quicksilver in May 1978 in the Kimberly-Schmidtsdrift-Douglas area
- Exercise Eagle Hill 1 in April 1979 at Lohatla

=== Operational Activation ===
As a Citizen Force structure, 72 Motorised Brigade would make use of call-up orders for its personnel to generally report for 3 months service. Headquarters staff would then leave for Tempe near Bloemfontein, where a transfer camp would be established to process troops en route to the operational area in northern South West Africa. Processing of units would include personal documentation, a medical examination, inoculation and the issuing of equipment and weapons. Each unit on completion of the necessary processing, would entrain to the Olienhoutplaat Station for a six-day journey to Grootfontein, the railhead near the Operational Area.

=== South West Africa and Angola ===
In January 1976 72 Motorised Brigade was mobilised mainly to protect the Ruacana/Caluque Water scheme in the Cunene River. Colonel S.W.J. Kotze took control of the Brigade at that stage. On 27 March 1976, the formation returned from Angola.

=== The rear headquarters ===
By 1978, the Brigade took over 1 Mobilisation Centre in Pretoria as its Rear Headquarters.

=== Freedom of the City ===
72 Motorised Brigade received the Freedom of Johannesburg on 16 February 1980.

== Insignia ==
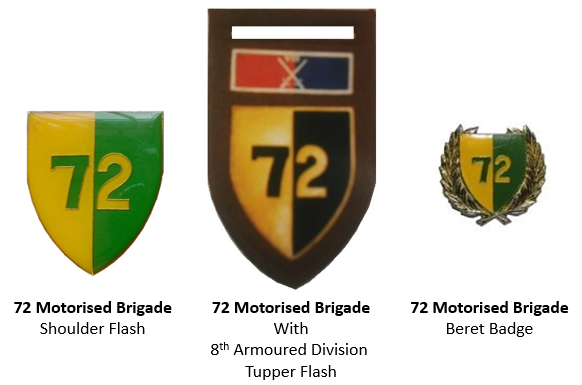
SADF era 72 Brigade insignia

== Leadership ==
Leadership
From	Officer Commanding	To	Ribbon
1974	Brig S.J. Terblanche		
1976	Col S.W.J. Kotze	1980	
1980	Col E. Webb		
From	Regimental Sergeants Major	To	Ribbon
1989	WO1 L. Brooke		
