= 7 South African Infantry Division =

7 Division SADF
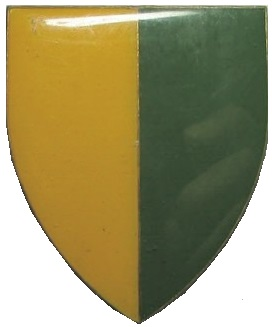
- SADF 7 Division original Flash
- Active: 1965–1999
- Country: South Africa
- Branch: South African Army
- Type: Infantry
- Size: Division

Commanders
- Officer Commanding 1972: Major General Neil Webster
- Officer Commanding 1980: Brigadier G.P. Kruys
- Officer Commanding 1983: Brigadier Helm Roos
- Officer Commanding 1987: Brigadier General Gerrie Moolman
- Officer Commanding: Brigadier H.B. Smit
- Officer Commanding 1992: Brigadier General Roland de Vries

Insignia
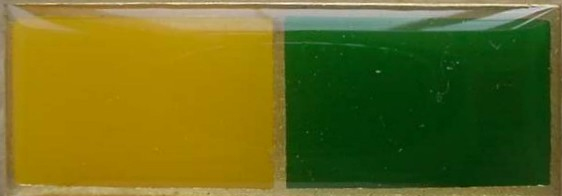
- SADF 7 Division Command Bar

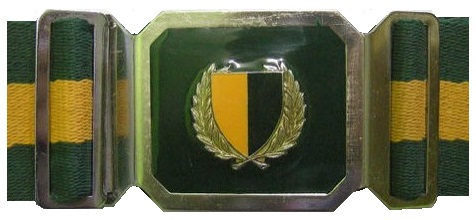
- SADF 7 Division Stable Belt

7 South African Infantry Division was a formation of the South African Army, active from the 1960s to 1999.

== History ==
=== Origin of 7 Division from existing and new Brigades ===
7 Division and 17, 18 and 19 Brigades were established on 1 April 1965. Difficulties with manning levels saw the disestablishment of 7 Division on 1 November 1967 and its replacement by the Army Task Force (HQ) and 16 Brigade.

=== Re-designated Headquarters ===
On 2 April 1971, a small band of officers (Brigadier Webster, Colonel Klaus Von Lieres, Colonel Hugh Hardingham, Major Barry York, Major Gerrie Moolman, Captain Bertie Suter, and Captain Manus Bothma) were summoned to meet with Major General Stapelberg (Combat General, Witwatersrand Command) to inaugurate the establishment of 7 Division, South African Army. The meeting took place at the headquarters of the Transvaal Irish Regiment in Johannesburg.

From 1 September 1972 Army Task Force Headquarters was redesignated HQ 7 Division.

=== Sister Divisions ===
Two years later, it was decided to organise the Army's conventional force into two divisions, 7th and 8th South African Armoured Divisions, under a Corps Headquarters. Both were primarily reserve (Citizen Force) formations, though the division and brigade HQs were Permanent Force. The headquarters of these two divisions were established on 1 August 1974. 1 South African Corps itself was established in August 1974 and was active until 30 January 1994.

=== Leadership ===
7 Division was commanded by:

Leadership
From	Officer Commanding	To	Ribbon
1972	Maj Gen Neil Webster (Note: Original commanding officer of 7th Division)	1980	
1980	Brig G.P. Kruys	1983	
1983	Brig Helm Roos	1987	
1987	Brig Gen Gerrie Moolman (Note: Originally assigned to the Division in 1971, as a Major (TSO2), to assist with the establishment of the Division's headquarters.)		
	Brig H.B. Smit		
1992	Brig Gen Roland de Vries SD,SM,MMM (Note: Later Major General) (Note: Later Deputy Chief of the South African Army)	1995	Southern Cross Decoration SD Southern Cross Medal SM Military Merit Medal MMM
From	Regimental Sergeants Major	To	Ribbon
	No known incumbents		

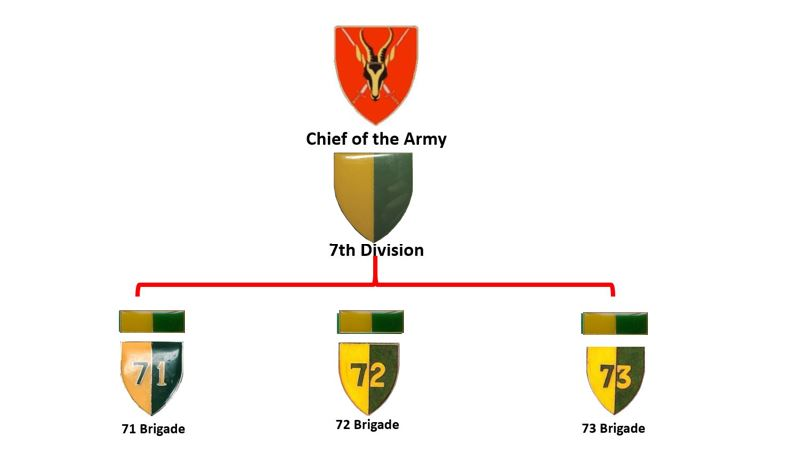
SADF 7th Division original structure c. 1974

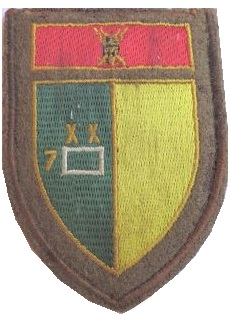
SADF original 7 Division patch badge 1970's

It appears from Colonel Lionel Crook's book on 71 Brigade that two of 7 Division's three brigades were redesignations of 17th and 18th Brigades. 71 Motorised Brigade was the former 17 Brigade, 72 Brigade was the former 18 Brigade, and 73 Brigade was a new formation.

=== Divisional Level Attached Units ===
==== Artillery, maintenance, engineers, signals and provost (Military Police) ====
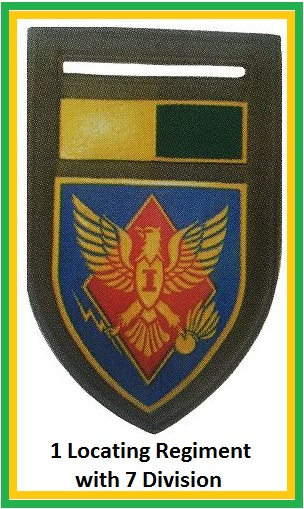
SADF 1 Locating Regiment Flash

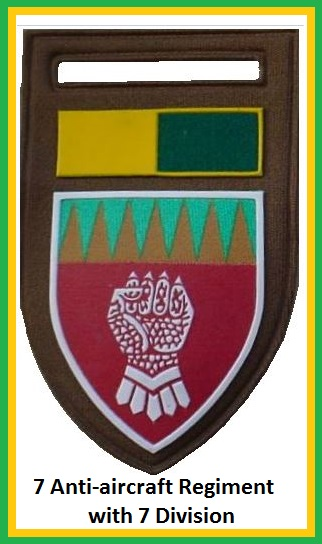
SADF 7 Division 7 Light Anti aircraft Regiment Flash. This regiment with Regiment Vaalriver(35mm) and 6 Light Anti-Aircraft Regiment(20mm) provided Divisional anti-aircraft support.

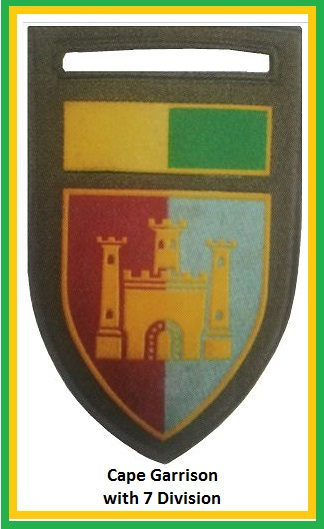
SADF 7 Division Cape Garrison Artillery Flash

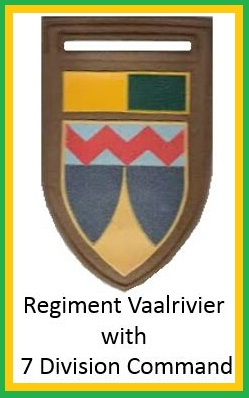
SADF 7 Division Regiment Vaalrivier Flash

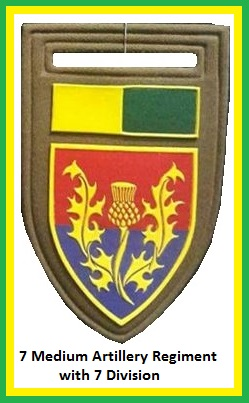
SADF 7 Division 7 Medium Artillery Regiment Unit Flash

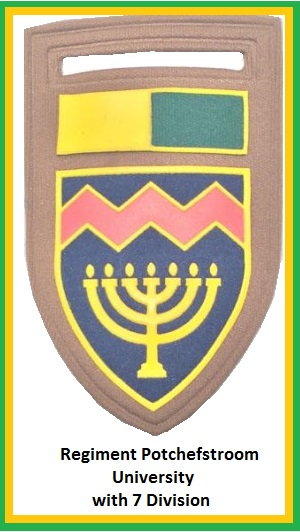
SADF 7 Division University of Potchefstroom Regiment Flash

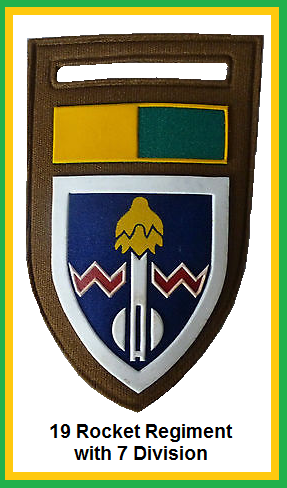
SADF 7 Division 19 Rocket Regiment Flash

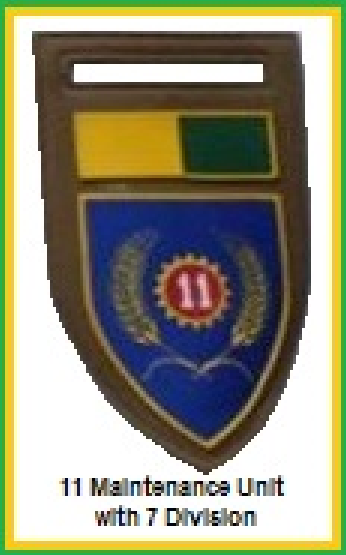
SADF 7 Division 11 Maintenance Unit Flash

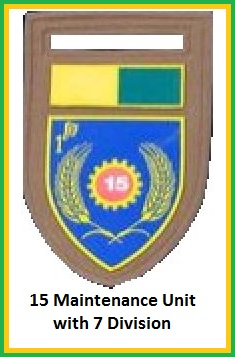
SADF 7 Division 15 Maintenance Unit Flash

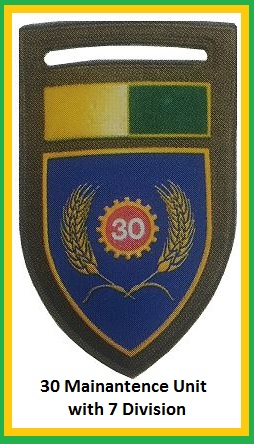
SADF 7 Division 30 Maintenance Unit Flash

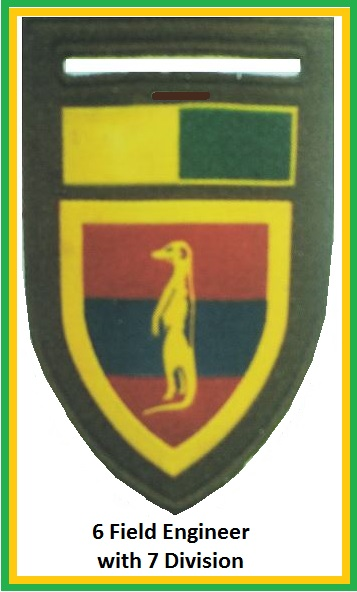
SADF 7 Division 6 Field Engineer Flash

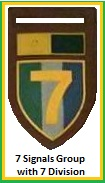
SADF 7 Division 7 Signals Group Flash

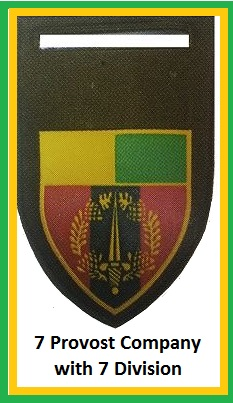
SADF 7 Division Provost Company Flash. During 1998, this unit was re-named to 17 Provost Company and transferred to 1 Provost Regiment of the Military Police Division. This was the same time that units of the division were transferred to Type Formations of the SA Army.

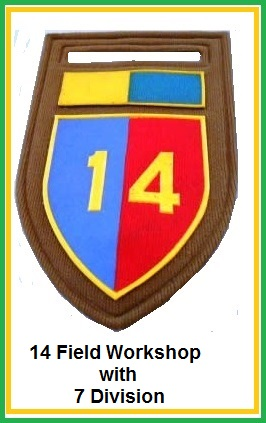
SADF 7 Division 14 Field Workshop Flash

=== 71 Motorised Brigade ===
71 Motorised Brigade was established in Cape Town (in the Western Province Command area). Units transferred from Western Province Command to the new 71 Motorised Brigade included the Cape Field Artillery, the Cape Town Highlanders, Regiment Westelike Provinsie, Regiment Boland, Regiment Oranjerivier, South African Engineer Corps 3 field squadron, 74 Signal Squadron SACS, 4 Maintenance Unit SAOSC, 30 Field Workshop SAOSC, and 3 Field Ambulance. 12 Supply and Transport Company, originally established on 22 August 1961, became 4 Maintenance Unit on 1 September 1971.

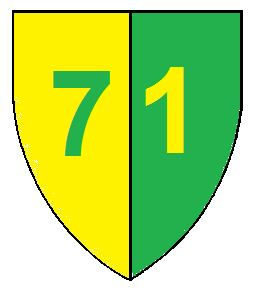

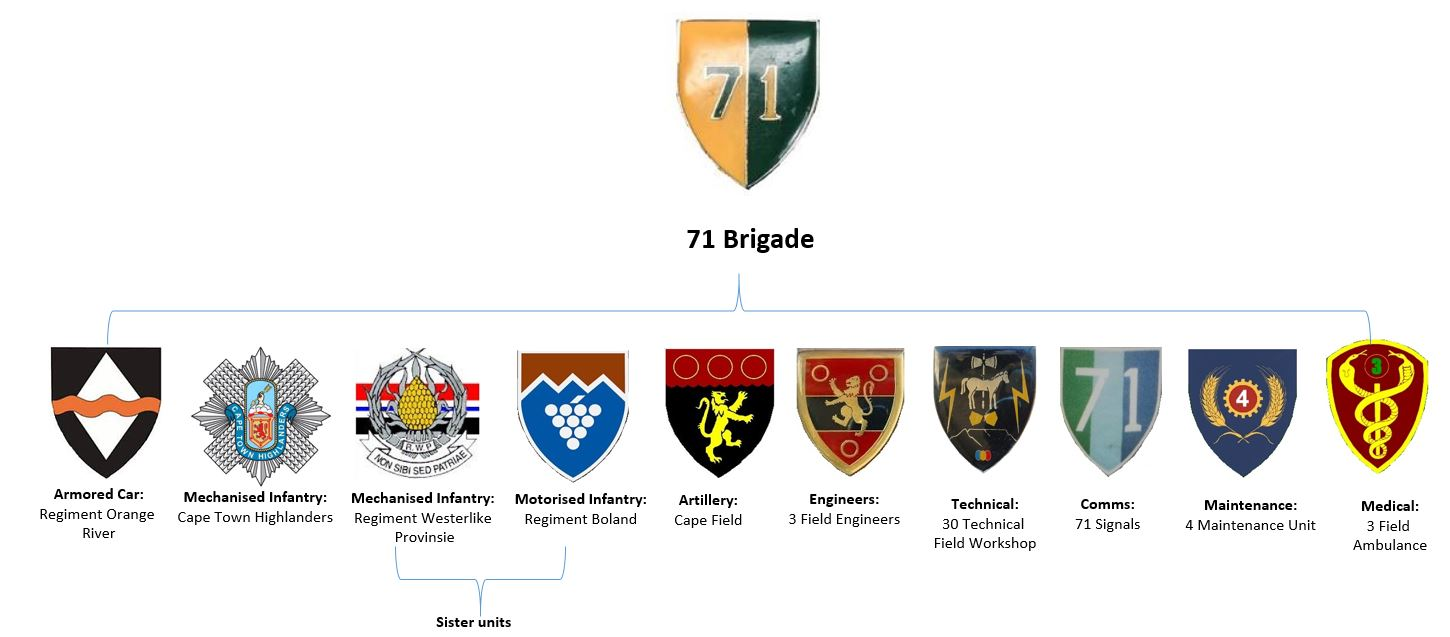
SADF 7 Division 71 Brigade associated units

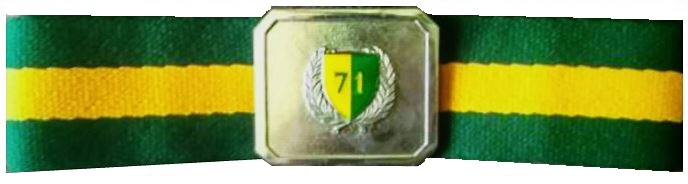
SADF 7 Division 71 Brigade stable belt

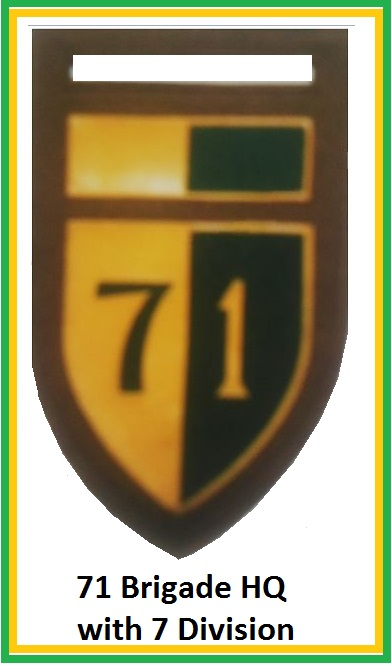
SADF 7 Division 71 Brigade HQ Flash

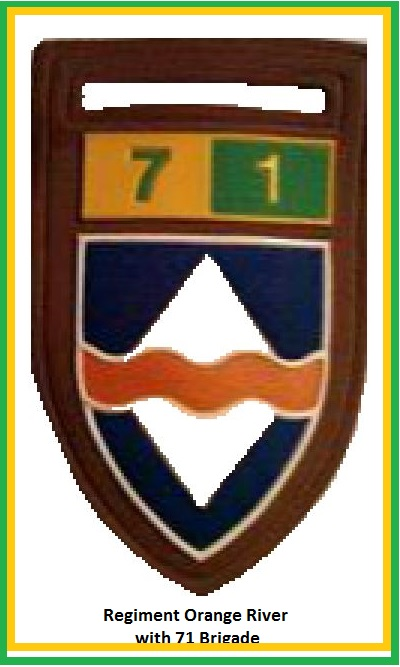
SADF 7 Division 71 Brigade Regiment Orange River Flash

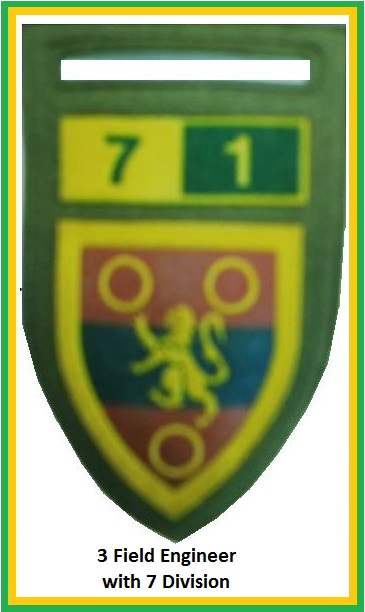
SADF 7 Division 71 Brigade 3 Field Engineer Flash

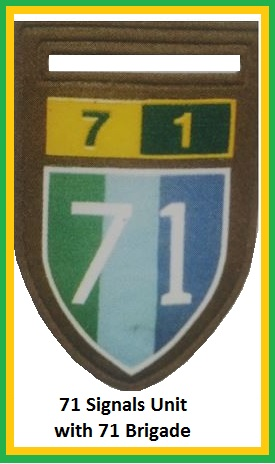
SADF 7 Division 71 Brigade Signals Unit Flash

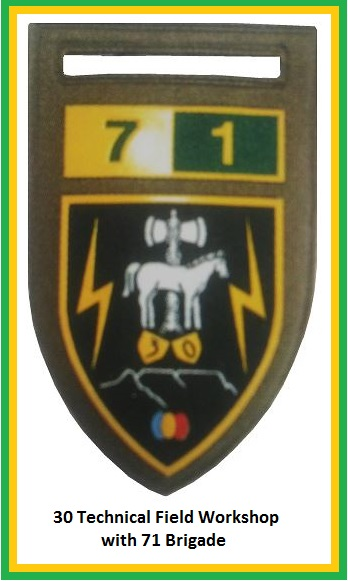
SADF 7 Division 71 Brigade 30 Technical Field Workshop Flash

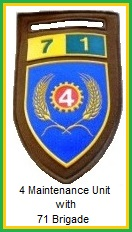
SADF 4 Maintenance Unit with 71 Brigade Unit Flash

=== 72 Motorised Brigade ===
72 Motorised Brigade was established in Kensington, Johannesburg 72 Motorised Brigade appears to have been made up of the following units, soon after formation in 1972. Infantry included 1st Battalion, Transvaal Scottish, the South African Irish Regiment, and the Johannesburg Regiment, artillery was provided by the Transvaal Horse Artillery, armour by the 1 Light Horse Regiment, engineer support by 12 Field Squadron SAEC, signals by 72 Signals Unit SACS, and service support by 31 Field Workshop and 7 Maintenance Unit.

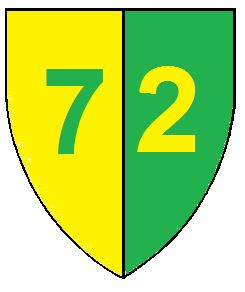

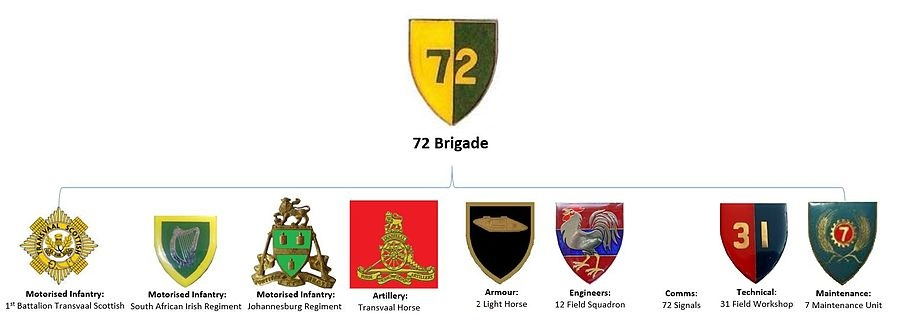
SADF 7 Division 72 Brigade associated units

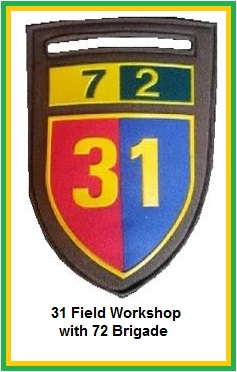
SADF 31 Field Workshop with 72 Brigade Unit Flash

=== 73 Motorised Brigade ===
73 Motorised Brigade was established in Pretoria.73 Motorised Brigade may have also had its headquarters at Kensington (Johannesburg) for some time.

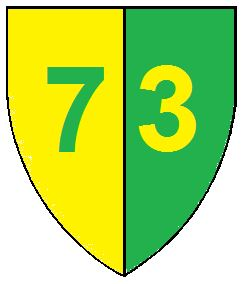

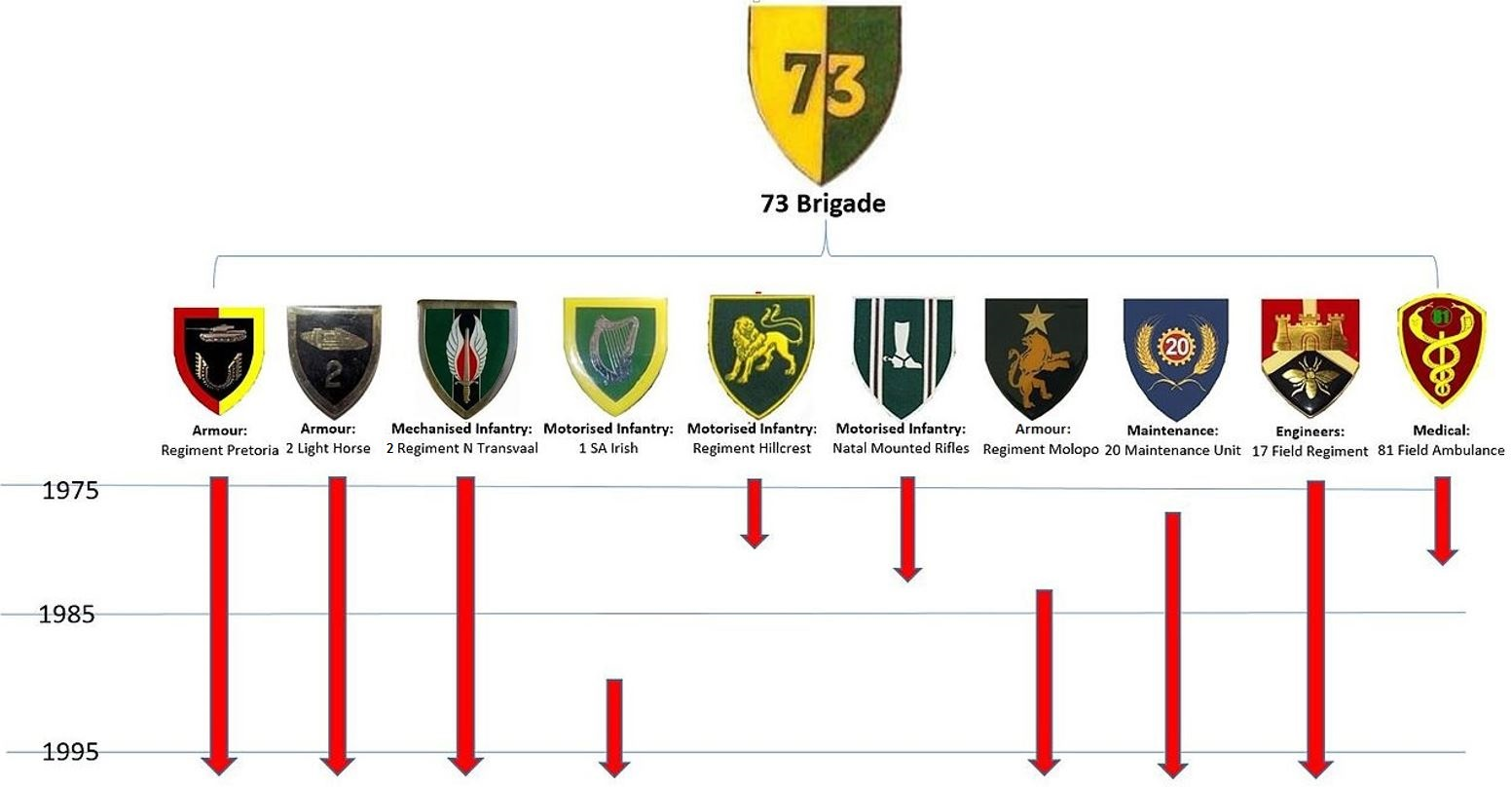
SADF 7 Division 73 Brigade associated units over time

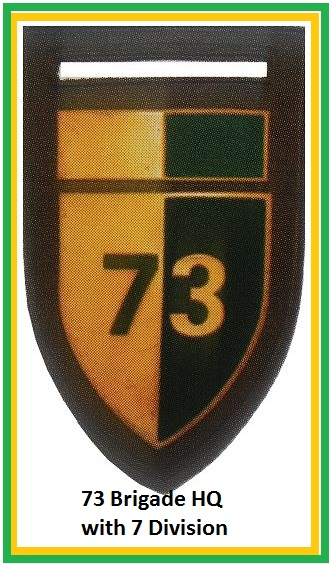
SADF 7 Division 73 Brigade HQ Flash

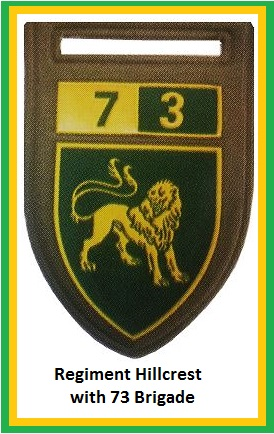
SADF 7 Division 73 Brigade Regiment Hillcrest Flash

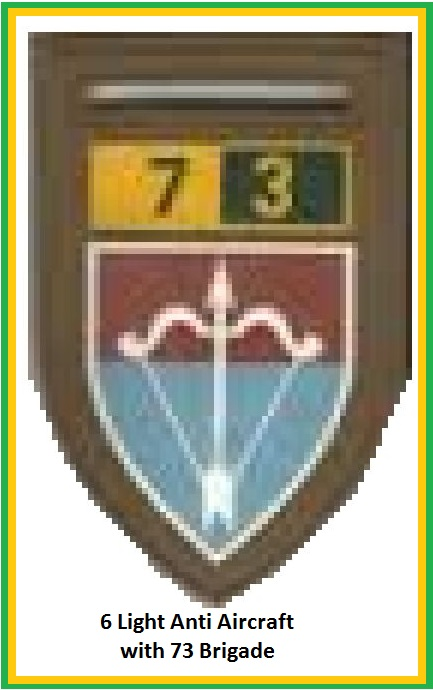
SADF 7 Division 73 Brigade 6 Light Anti Aircraft Flash

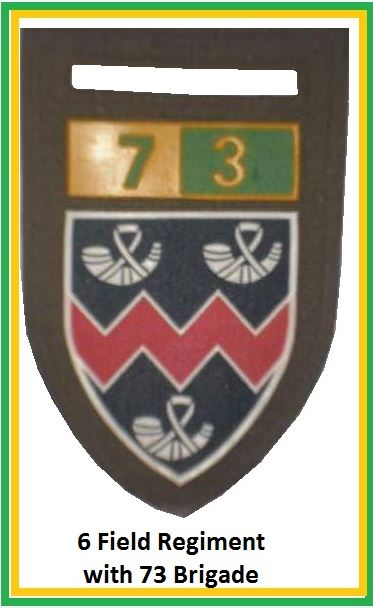
SADF 7 Division 73 Brigade Vrystaat Artillerie Regiment Flash

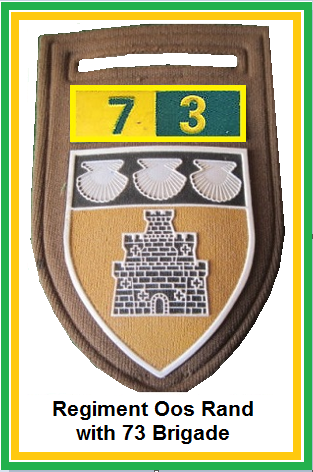
SADF 7 Division 73 Brigade Regiment Oos Rand Flash

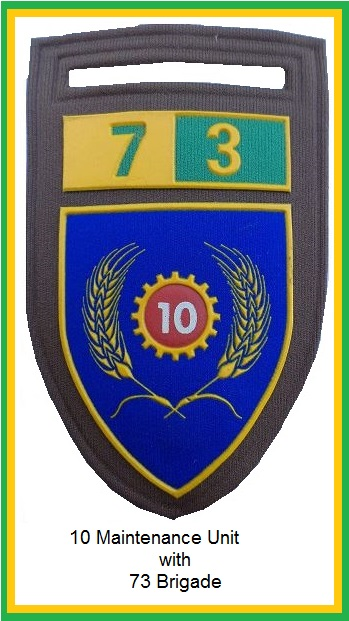
SADF 7 Division 10 Maintenance Unit Flash

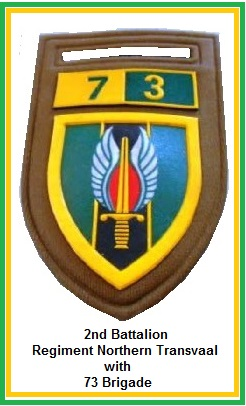
SADF 7 Division 73 Brigade Regiment Northern Transvaal 2nd Battalion tupper flash

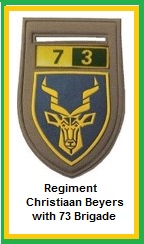
SADF 7 Division 73 Brigade Regiment Christiaan Beyers tupper flash

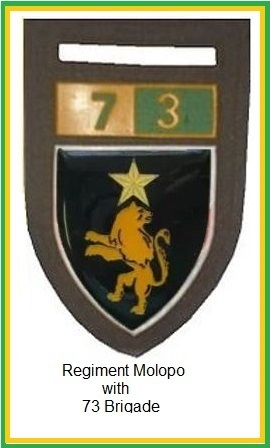
SADF era 73 Brigade regiment Molopo insignia tupper flash
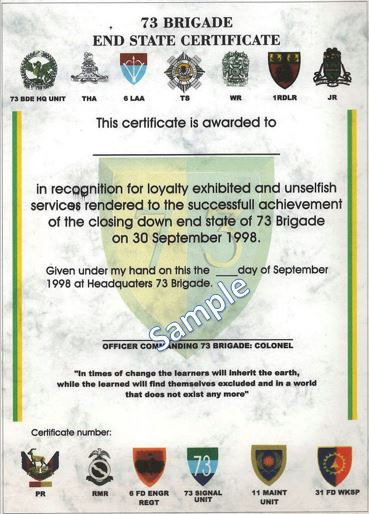
SADF End state certificate 73 Brigade from 1998. Note how different the Brigade units were at this stage.

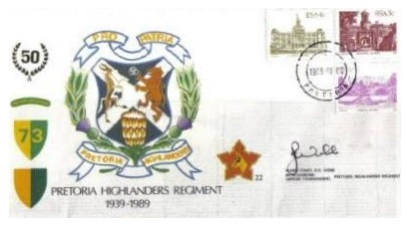
SADF 73 Brigade Pretoria Highlanders Commemorative letter

== Mobilisation and Exercises ==
7 Division had its own Mobilisation Centre based at de Brug near Bloemfontein.

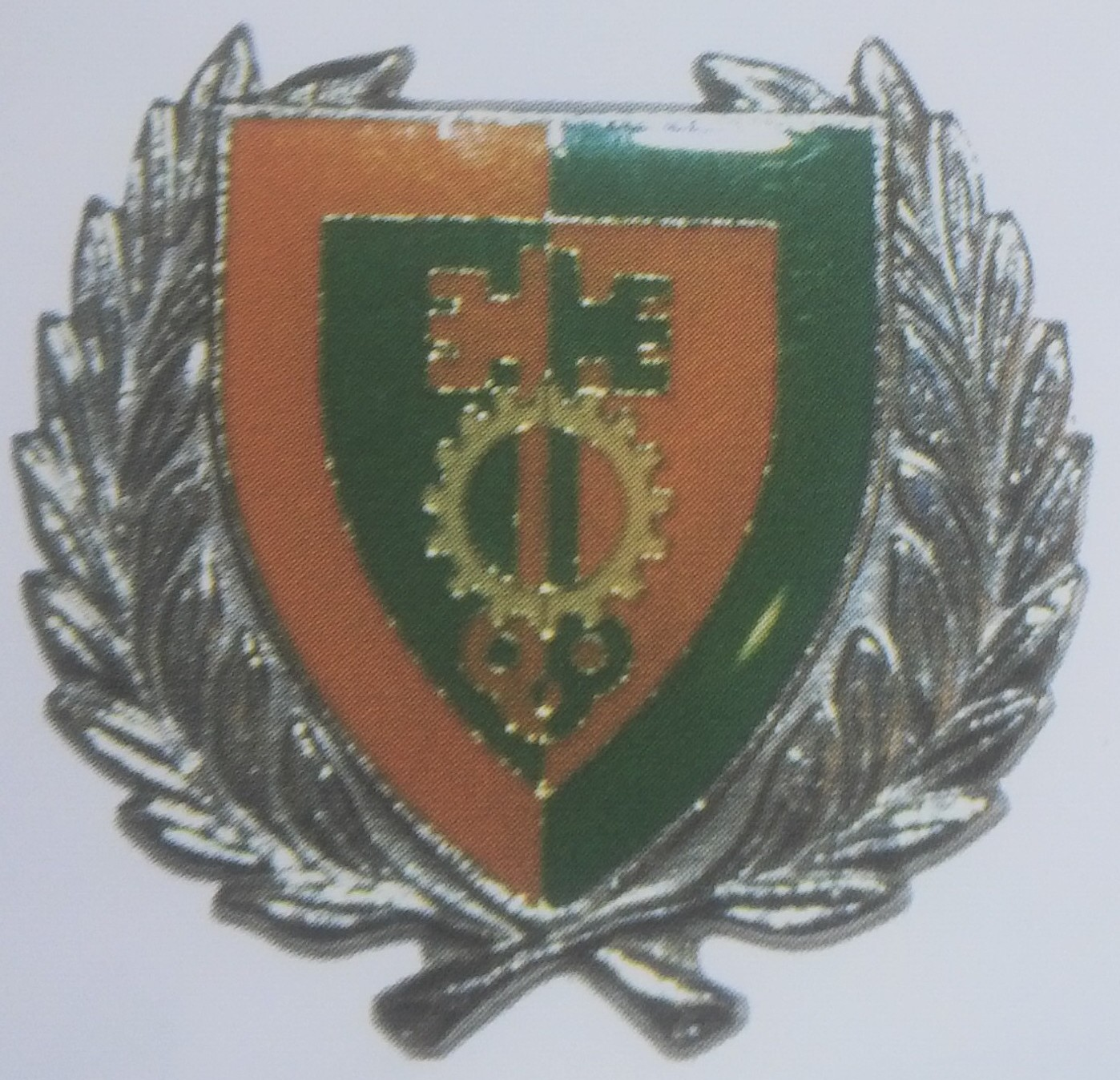
SADF 7th Division Mobilisation Centre

7 Division's major training exercises were held at Lohatla Army Battle School in the Northern Cape, called Quick Silver and Thunder Chariot, one of the most notable was the Thunder Chariot of 1984:

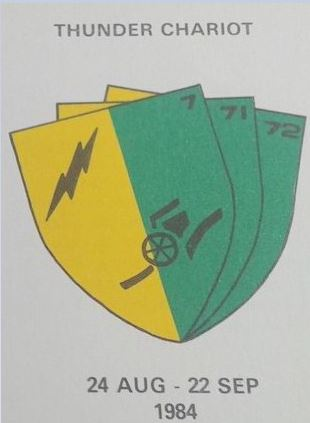
SADF 7 Division Exercise Thunder Chariot 1984

== Command Theatres ==
In the early 1980s, the Army was restructured to counter all forms of insurgency while at the same time maintaining a credible conventional force. To meet these requirements, the Army was subdivided into conventional and counterinsurgency forces. The Citizen Force, through the 7th and 8th Divisions, provided the Conventional Defence Force. In 1984 Northern Transvaal Command was subdivided and Far North Command (Pietersburg) formed. These two new Commands were regarded as theatres and as such also had responsibility for conventional operations (and units) within their areas. Far North Command had 73 Motorised Brigade within its area; it is not clear how much influence HQ 7 SA Division then had over that Brigade.

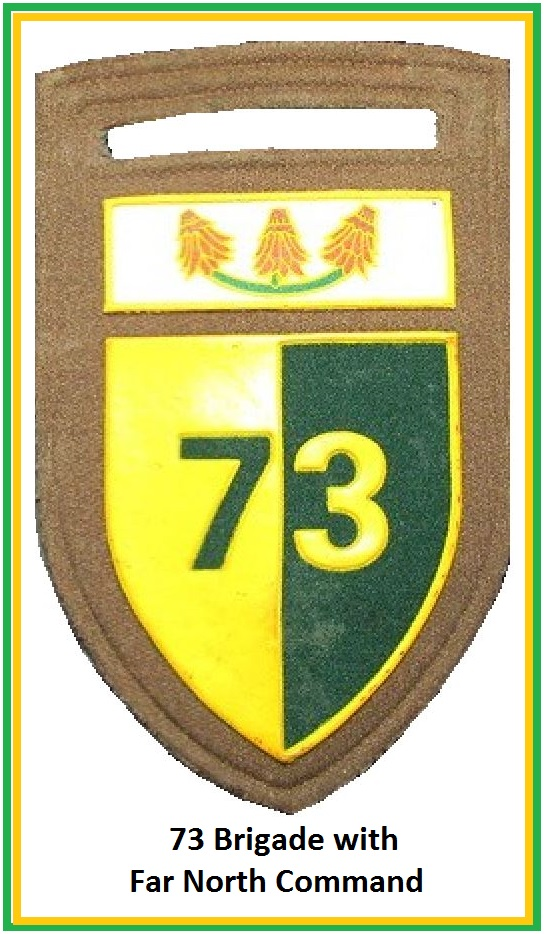
SADF 73 Brigade with Far North Command Flash

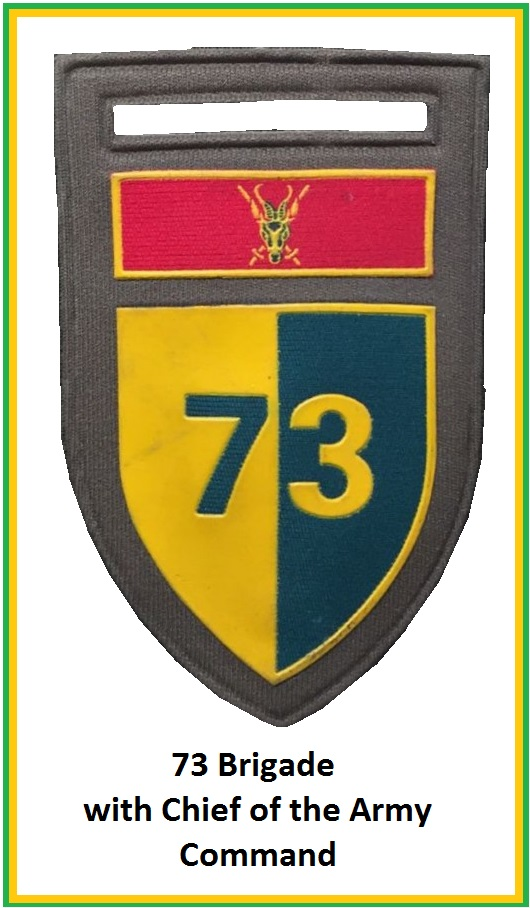
SADF 73 Brigade with Chief of the Army Command Flash

== Inter-divisional Reorganizing ==
By 1985, 7 Division consisted of 71 Motorised Brigade, 73 Motorised Brigade and 82 Mechanised Brigade. 72 Motorised Brigade had been transferred to the command of 8th South African Armoured Division.

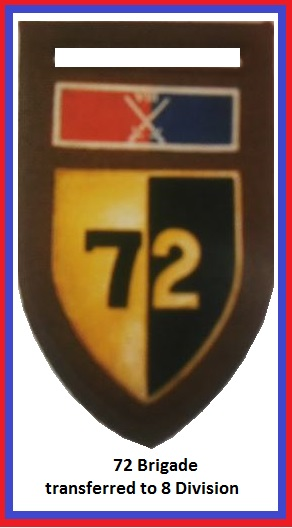
SADF 72 Brigade with 8th Armoured Division Command Flash

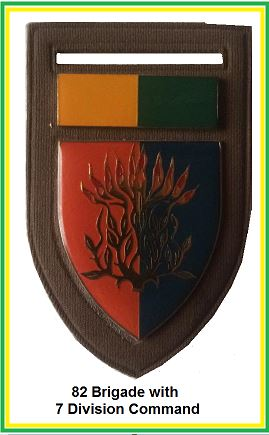
SADF 82 Brigade with 7th Division Command Flash

7 South African Infantry Division
- Active: 1991–1999
- Country: South Africa
- Allegiance: South Africa
- Branch: South African Army
- Type: Infantry
- Size: Division

Insignia
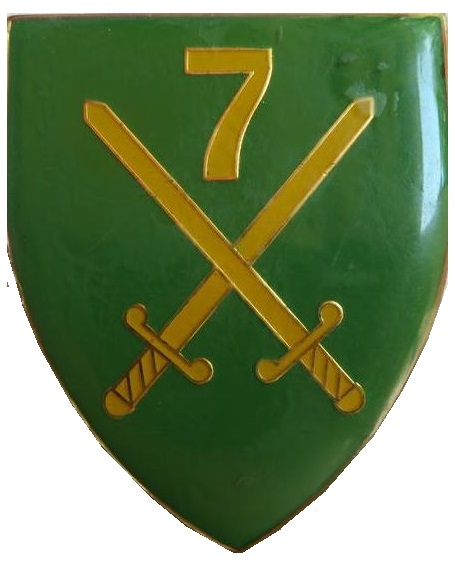
- SADF 7 SA Infantry Division flash

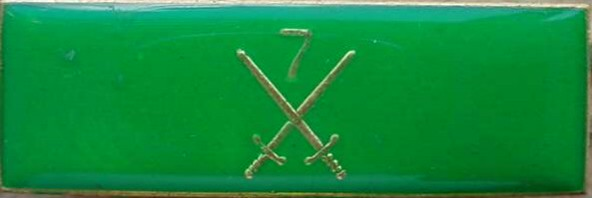
- 7th SA Infantry Division Command Bar

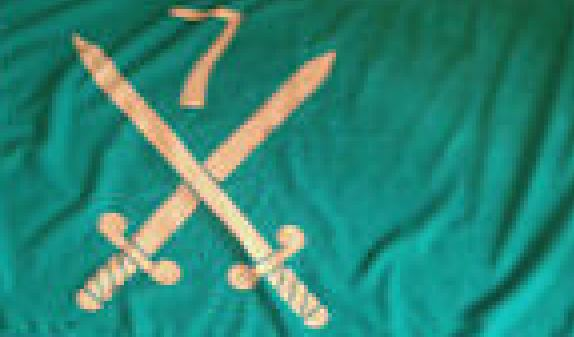
- 7th SA Infantry Division flag

- SADF 7 SA Infantry Division Stable belt

== Renaming ==
In the latter half of 1991 the official division designation of 7 Division was altered to 7 South African Infantry Division.

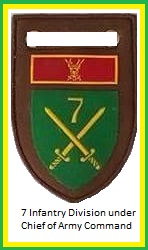
7 South African Infantry Division with Chief of Army Command

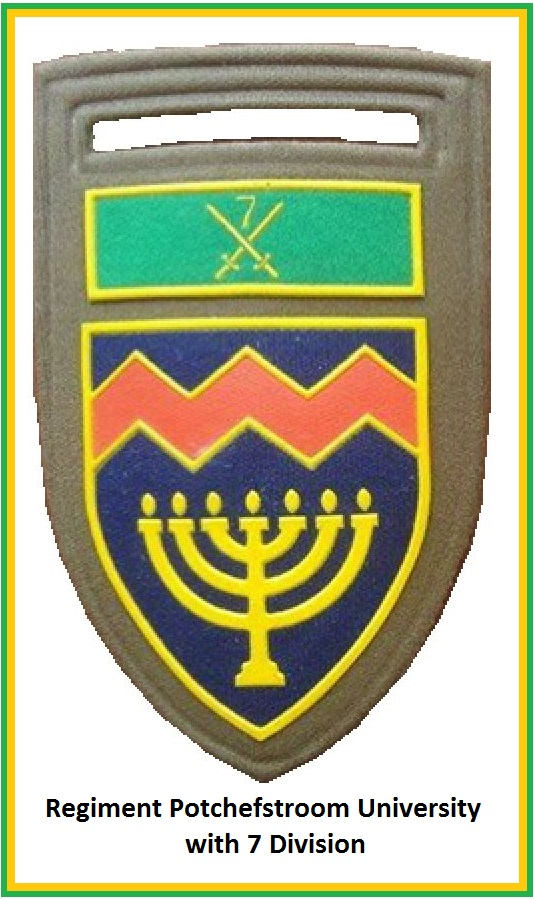
Regiment Potchefstroom Universiteit with 7 South African Infantry Division Command

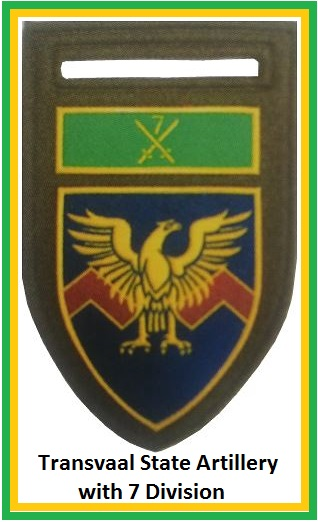
Transvaal State Artillery with 7 South African Infantry Division Command

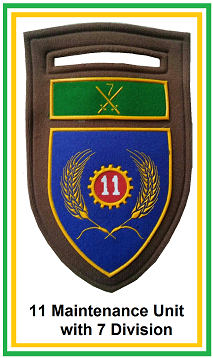
11 Maintenance Unit with 7 South African Infantry Division Command

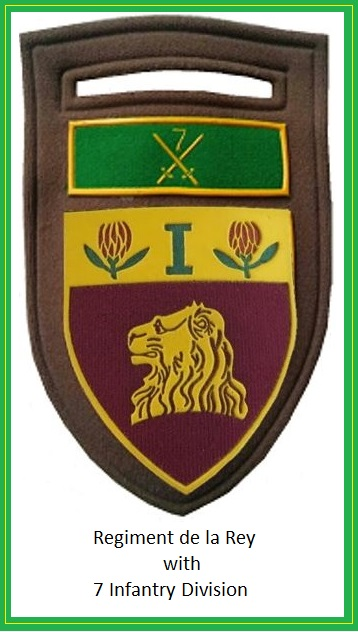
Regiment de la Rey 1st Battalion with 7 South African Infantry Division

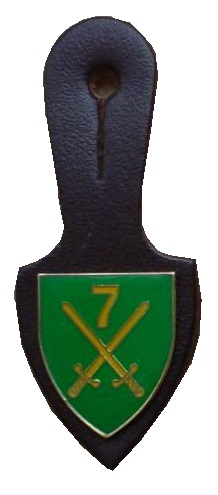
SADF 7 SA Infantry Division Pocket badge

== Divisional restructuring ==
Between 1992 until 1 April 1997, the Army reduced each division's size while creating a third divisional headquarters, 9th South African Division. Divisional headquarters remained in the Johannesburg area (7 Division). These 3 Divisions each now consisted of :

- a reconnaissance battalion,
- two anti-aircraft defence battalions (AA guns),
- two battalions of artillery (G-5s and G-6s),
- a battalion of 127mm MRLs,
- an engineer battalion,
- two battalions of Olifant MBTs,
- two infantry battalions mounted in Ratel ICVs, and
- finally two infantry battalions mounted in Buffel APCs.

To provide part of these forces, 6th Light Anti-Aircraft Regiment joined 7 Division in 1991.

== Divisions re-designated as Brigades and returned to 7 South African Infantry Division ==
=== 74 Brigade ===
8th South African Armoured Division's Brigades were disbanded in 1992 and the Battalions and Regiments came to answer directly to the Divisional headquarters. The Division itself was effectively disbanded on 1 April 1997, when its former units became part of 7 South African Division as 74 Brigade.

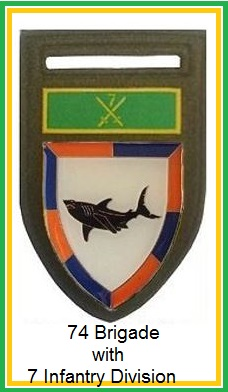
Early SANDF era 7 Division 74 Brigade with 7 Infantry Division tupper flash

=== 75 Brigade ===
9th South African Division, (the previous 71 Brigade) was also effectively disbanded on 1 April 1997, when its former units became part of 7 South African Infantry Division again. They were all amalgamated into the 7th South African Infantry Division on 1 April 1997, and became 75 Brigade.

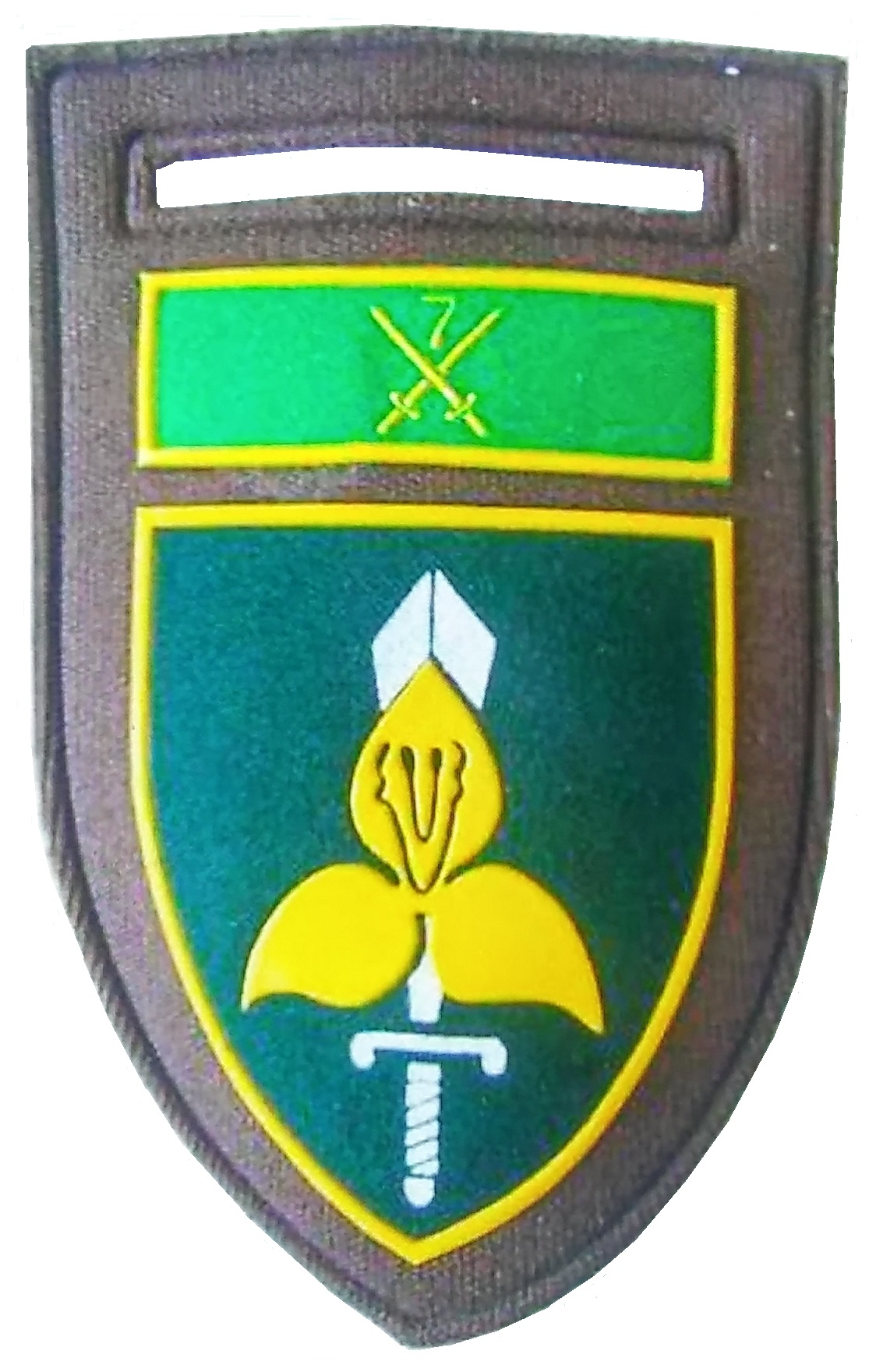
SANDF 9 Division redesignated as 75 Brigade with 7 Division

=== Final Divisional Structure ===
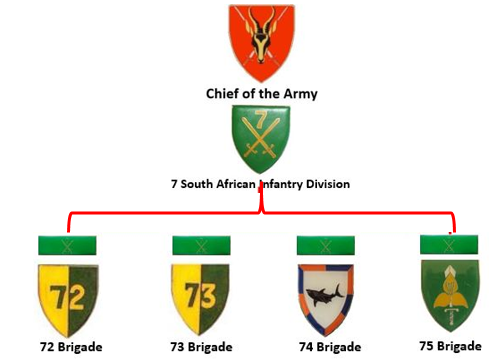
SADF 7 South African Infantry Division structure

== Disbandment ==
7 South African Infantry Division itself was disbanded on 1 April 1999 and all army battalions were assigned to 'type' formations, in accordance with the recommendations of the South African Defence Review 1998.

== Insignia ==
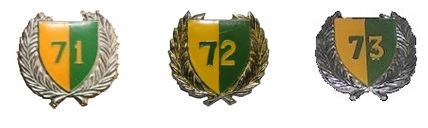
SADF 7 Division Brigade beret emblems

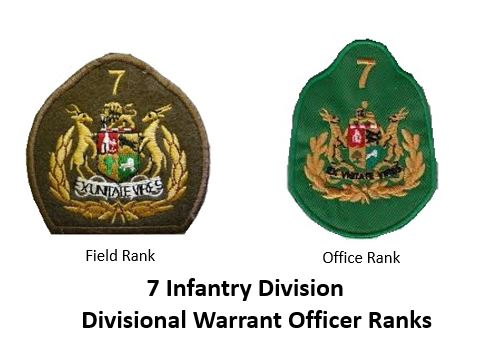
SADF 7 Infantry Division Warrant Officer Insignia

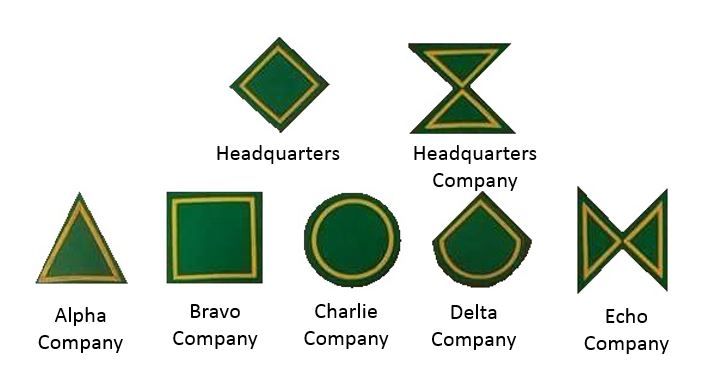
SADF 7 Infantry Division Company Flashes

== Additional reading ==
- John Keegan, World Armies, p. 639, cited in Lt Cdr Carl T. Orbann USN, 'South African Defense Policy,' Thesis for the Naval Postgraduate School, Monterey, CA., June 1984. Keegan edited this volume, though a different author wrote the section on the South African Army. There are at least three errors in the listing of 7 and 8 Divisions described as being as of the date of the book (1979 or 1983). Two towns are misspelt, and one regiment still has the royal title incorporated despite the 'Royal' prefix having been dropped after 1965. Thus it is not clear how accurate the South African order-of-battle section is.
