= Baring baronets of Nubia House (1911) =

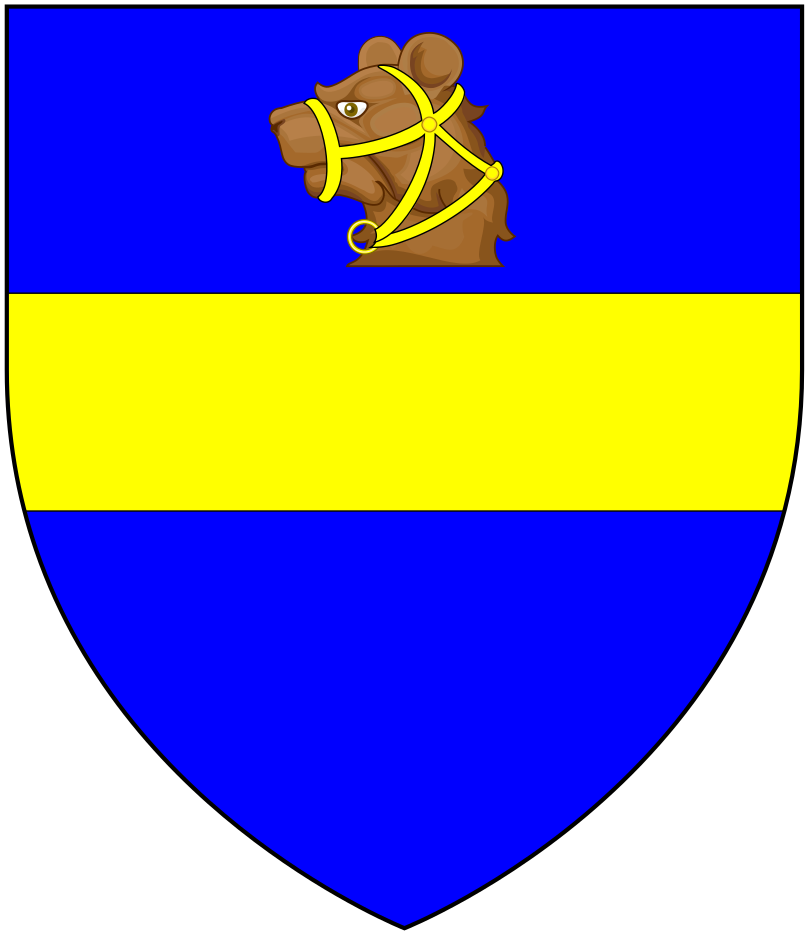
Escutcheon of the Baring baronets of Nubia House

The Baring baronetcy, of Nubia House in the parish of Northwood in the Isle of Wight, was created in the Baronetage of the United Kingdom on 4 February 1911 for the politician Godfrey Baring. He was the son of Lieutenant-General Charles Baring, son of Henry Bingham Baring, son of Henry Baring, third son of the 1st Baronet of the 1793 creation.

The 2nd Baronet, eldest son of the 1st Baronet, was an officer in the Coldstream Guards. He died childless and was succeeded in 1990 by his nephew John Francis Baring, the 3rd Baronet.

== Baring baronets, of Nubia House (1911) ==
- Sir Godfrey Baring, 1st Baronet (1871–1957)
- Sir Charles Christian Baring, 2nd Baronet (1898–1990)
- Sir John Francis Baring, 3rd Baronet (born 1947)

The heir apparent is the current holder's son Julian Alexander David Baring (born 1975).

== Notes ==
Baronetage of the United Kingdom
Preceded by Balfour baronets	Baring baronets of Nubia House; 4 February 1911	Succeeded by Graaf baronets
