= Graaff baronets =

Baronetcy in the Baronetage of the United Kingdom

Escutcheon of the Graaff baronets of Cape Town featuring an Agnus Dei lamb under a Southern Cross star constellation.

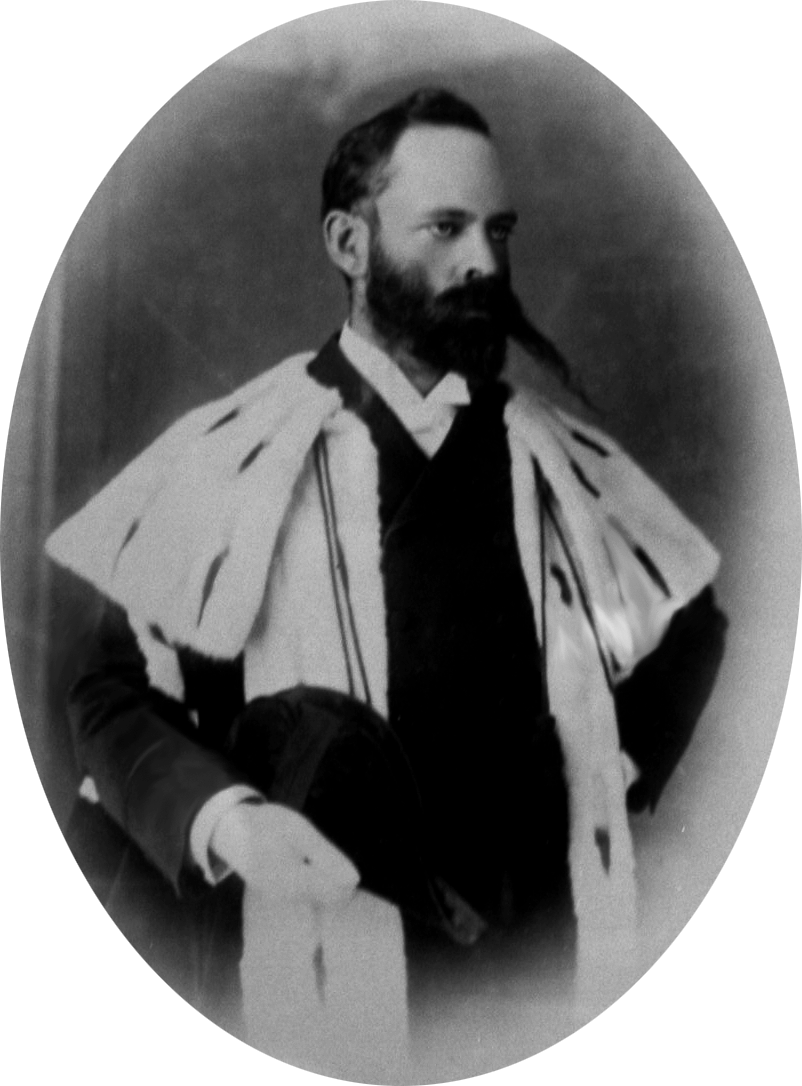
Sir David Graaff, 1st Baronet, as Mayor of Cape Town

The Graaff baronetcy, of Cape Town in the Cape of Good Hope Province of the Union of South Africa, is a title in the Baronetage of the United Kingdom. It was created on 6 February 1911 for the South African businessman and politician David Pieter de Villiers Graaff. His son, the 2nd Baronet, was also a politician and served as leader of the United Party between 1956 and 1977.

== Graaff baronets, of Cape Town (1911) ==
- Sir David Pieter de Villiers Graaff, 1st Baronet (1859–1931)
- Sir De Villiers "Div" Graaff, 2nd Baronet (1913–1999)
- Sir David de Villiers Graaff, 3rd Baronet (1940–2015)
- Sir De Villiers Graaff, 4th Baronet (born 1970)

The heir apparent to the title is the current holder's son David Peter Berkeley de Villiers Graaff (born 2003).

== Extended family ==
- Jacobus Arnoldus Graaff (1863–1927): Sir David Graaff, 1st Baronet's younger brother and business partner. He was also a politician and government minister.
- Johannes de Villiers Graaff (1928–2015): Sir David Graaff, 1st Baronet's youngest son and welfare economist.

== See also ==
- Baron de Villiers

== Notes ==
Baronetage of the United Kingdom
Preceded by Baring baronets	Graaf baronets of Cape Town; 6 February 1911	Succeeded by Henry baronets
