= 7 Light Anti-Aircraft Regiment =

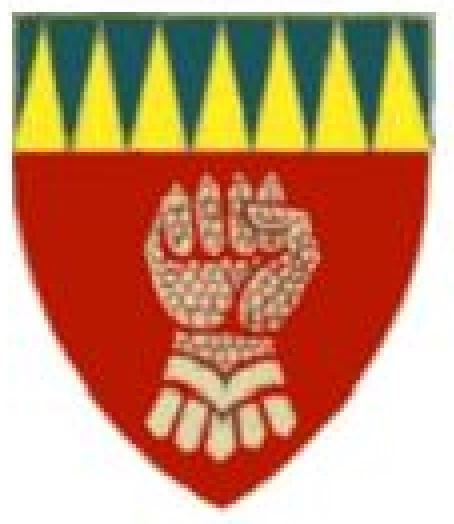
- SANDF 7 Light Anti-Aircraft Regiment emblem
- Active: 1 April 1969 - 31 March 1997
- Country: South Africa
- Allegiance: Republic of South Africa; Republic of South Africa
- Branch: South African Army; South African Army
- Type: Reserve Artillery
- Part of: South African Anti-Aircraft; Citizen Force
- Garrison/HQ: Wingfield, Cape Town

Insignia
- Collar Badge: Bursting grenade with seven flames
- Beret Colour: Oxford Blue
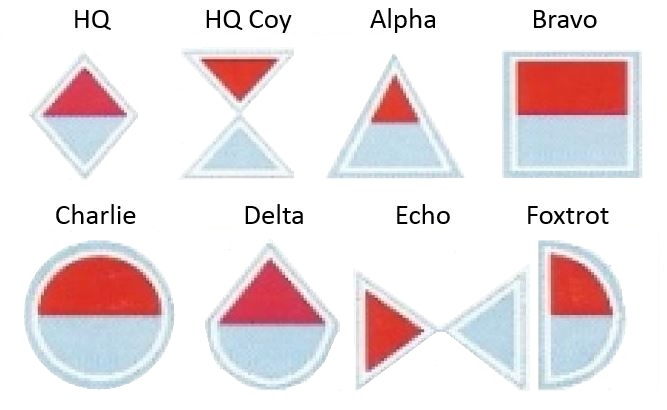
- Battery emblems

- Beret bar circa 1992

7 Light Anti-Aircraft Regiment was a Citizen Force regiment of the South African Army.

== History ==
=== Origin ===
7 Light Anti-Aircraft Regiment was established on 1 April 1969, but was not actually formed until August 1971. Its initial manpower was made up of surplus members from the University of Cape Town Regiment.

The regiment was deployed in several operations, including Operations 'Askari' (1984), 'Donderslag', 'Lightning', 'Packer', 'Prone' and 'Agro' In 1988, during Operation Packer, 72 Battery supplied air cover at the Chambinga Gorge near Cuito Cuanavale in Angola.

The regiment was one of many Citizen Force units that was disbanded when the army was scaled down in 1997.

=== Command Affiliation ===
Initially the regiment was assigned to 7 South African Infantry Division, but with the raising of 9 Division, it was transferred to the new organisation.

== Regimental Symbols ==
=== Dress Insignia ===
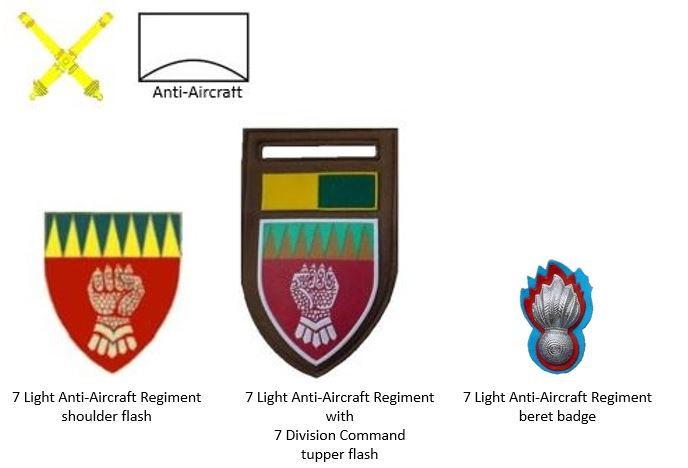
SADF era 7 Light Anti Aircraft Regiment insignia

== Officers Commanding ==
- Cmdt Arthur Henry Morris 1971 - 1978
- Cmdt Charles Withington 1978 - 1986
- Cmdt J. Selfe 1986 - 1987
- Cmdt J.W. Gafney 1987 - 1993
- Lt Col A.J. Stofberg 1993–1997

== Honorary Colonels ==
- Cmdt D.C. Robertson 1978 - 1981
- Maj Gen Ian S. Guilford 1982 - 1988
- W. Pretorius 1995 - 1997

== Freedom of the City ==
The regiment received the freedom of Goodwood on 31 March 1990.
