= Sir De Villiers Graaff, 4th Baronet =

Sir De Villiers Graaff, Bt
- Born: 16 July 1970; South Africa
- Education: University of Stellenbosh
- Occupations: Businessman, vintner, restaurateur
- Spouse: Gaedry Graaff
- Children: David Berkeley Graaff, Austin Graaff, Luca Graaff, Campbell Graaff

Sir De Villiers Graaff, 4th Baronet, is a South African businessman and owner of De Grendel Wine Estate. He is a noted restaurateur and vintner having won awards for wines produced on the De Grendel estate. The eldest son of Sir David Graaff, 3rd Baronet becoming the 4th Graaff Baronet on 24 January 2015. Graaff obtained his undergraduate degree in agriculture at University of Stellenbosch in 1993.

Baronetage of the United Kingdom
Preceded by Sir David Graaff	Baronet (of Tygerberg, South Africa); 2015–present	Incumbent
