= Baron de Villiers =

Barony in the Peerage of the United Kingdom

Baron de Villiers, of Wynberg in the Cape of Good Hope Province and the Union of South Africa, is a title in the Peerage of the United Kingdom. It was created on 21 September 1910 for the prominent South African lawyer and judge John de Villiers. He served as Chief Justice of South Africa between 1910 and 1914. The 3rd Baron graduated from Magdalen College, Oxford and worked as a barrister in Auckland, New Zealand. In 1949, he was admitted to the Supreme Court in Auckland. He lived in Huapai near Auckland. As of 2010, the title is held by his great-grandson, the fourth Baron, who succeeded his father in 2001.

Asked how to say his name, the third Baron told The Literary Digest: "In England it is pronounced 'Villars.' But the pronunciation which is used by English-speaking South Africans, and which I myself use, would be written duh vil'yers. There is a suspicion of an i sound between the l and the y."

== Barons de Villiers (1910) ==
- John de Villiers, 1st Baron de Villiers (1842–1914)
- Charles Percy de Villiers, 2nd Baron de Villiers (1871–1934)
- Arthur Percy de Villiers, 3rd Baron de Villiers (1911–2001)
- Alexander Charles de Villiers, 4th Baron de Villiers (b. 1940)

There is no heir to the barony.

=== Coat of arms ===
Coat of arms of Baron de Villiers
Coronet A coronet of a Baron Crest Issuant from a circlet of gold embellished with nine pearls raised upon points, a dexter arm in armour embowed grasping in the hand a seax argent. Escutcheon Azure, a bend enhanced argent, on a mount in base a Paschal Lamb proper. Supporters On either side a springbok proper, gorged with a circlet of gold, embellished with nine pearls raised upon points. Motto La Main A L'Oeuvre (The hand to the work)

== See also ==
- Graaff baronets
