= Regiment University of Cape Town =

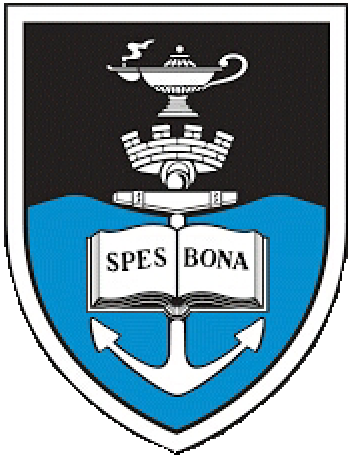
- SADF Regiment University of Cape Town emblem
- Active: 1958 to 1968
- Country: South Africa
- Allegiance: Republic of South Africa
- Branch: South African Army
- Type: Reserve Anti-Aircraft
- Part of: South African Army Artillery Formation; Army Conventional Reserve
- Garrison/HQ: Wingfield
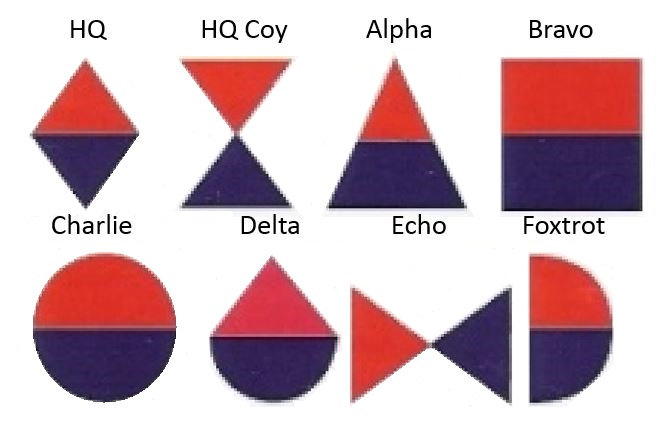
- Artillery Battery Emblems

- Artillery Beret Bar circa 1992

Regiment University of Cape Town was an artillery regiment of the South African Army. As a reserve unit, it had a status roughly equivalent to that of a British Army Reserve or United States Army National Guard unit. It was part of the South African Army Artillery Corps.

== History ==
By the 1950s, South Africa dedicated military units to each large university. The University of Cape Town was issued an anti-aircraft regiment transferred from the SA Marine Corps and composed of 51, 52 and 54 batteries known up to then as 4 Heavy Anti-Aircraft Regiment.

The idea was for students to honour their obligatory military training in such units. Training would also be organised so as not to disproportionately affect university work.

The Regiment's first deployment was during a State of Emergency in March and April 1960 where it was utilised as infantry outside townships around the Cape Peninsula.

Early in the 1960s, the Regiment moved from Youngsfield to its new headquarters at Wingfield.

=== Training ===
Until 1967, annual training lasted three weeks and was held at Eerste River while seaward gunnery practices were held at Strandfontein.

=== Equipment ===
The Regiment used the standard 3.7 inch gun was replaced by a 35mm anti-aircraft gun requiring a conversion camp was held in December 1969. A second conversion camp was held at Wingfield from 5–25 October 1973.

=== Regimental Command ===
- Commandant C.D. Stark 1960
- Commandant D.C. Robertson, JCD 1962
- Commandant J.K. van der Merwe 1967
- Commandant F.T. Croswell 1970
- Commandant W. Bannatyne, JCD 1973
- Honorary Colonel: Maj the Hon P.V.G. van der Byl

=== Notable Members ===
Prof Maj. Christiaan Barnard was at one stage, the Regiments’ medical officer.
