= Autshumato Anti-Aircraft Regiment =

Cape Town Volunteer Engineers Cape Garrison Artillery Autshumato Anti-Aircraft Regiment
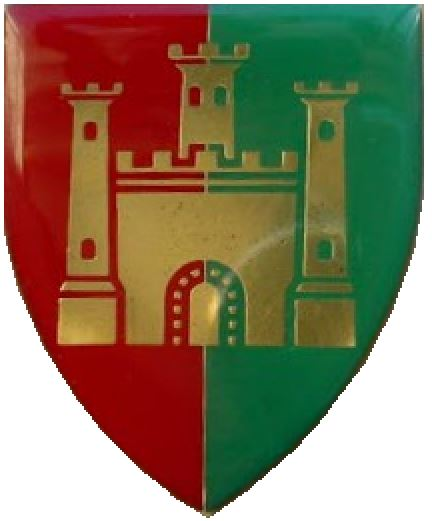
- Cape Garrison Artillery emblem
- Active: 1974 - present
- Country: South Africa
- Allegiance: Republic of South Africa; Republic of South Africa
- Branch: South African Army; South African Army
- Type: Reserve Air Defence Artillery
- Part of: South African Army Air Defence Artillery Formation; Army Conventional Reserve
- Garrison/HQ: Fort Wynyard
- Mottos: Quo Fas Et Gloria Ducunt (Whither right and glory lead); Ubique (Everywhere); Alta Pete (Aim High)
- Battle honours: South West Africa 1915

Insignia
- Collar Badge: Bursting grenade with seven flames
- Beret Colour: Oxford Blue
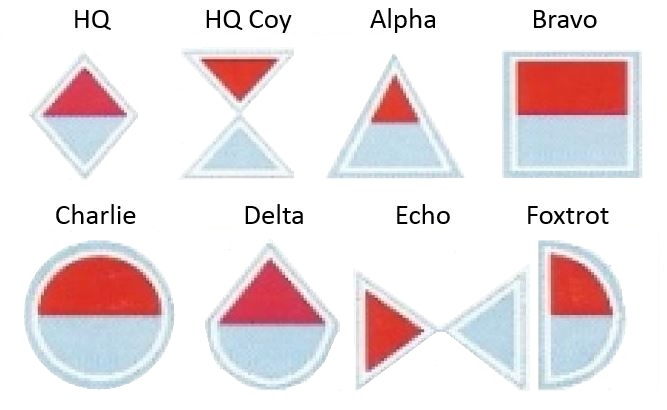
- Battery emblems

- Beret bar circa 1992
- Abbreviation: AAAR

The Autshumato Anti-Aircraft Regiment (formerly the Cape Garrison Artillery) is a reserve air defence artillery regiment of the South African Army.

== Cape Garrison Artillery (1st) ==
The original regiment had a fragmented history:

=== 1879-1899 ===
A new unit, called the Cape Town Volunteer Engineers was formed in the Cape Colonial Forces in 1879. It served in the Transkei campaign in 1880 and 1881. In 1889, it added a coast artillery company, and the title was later changed to Garrison Artillery & Engineer Volunteer Corps. Engineering was discontinued in 1896, and the title was then changed to Cape Garrison Artillery.

The commanding officer of the unit at that time was Major le Vicomte de Montfort. The Regiment had an authorised strength of 320 men and was trained by the Royal Garrison Artillery. In 1898 the CGA was changed to a partially paid unit and thus lost its volunteer status.

=== 1899-1902 ===
The CGA was mobilized for participation in the Second Anglo-Boer War in 1899. Initially the Regiment had 373 members, but the figure increased to 560 (with some recruits arriving from overseas) by February 1900.

During 1900 the CGA was mainly used on the main western railway line of Cape Colony, as well as west of that line, assisting in garrisoning important posts. A small number of CGA members were also under the command of Sir Charles Warren in Griqualand West. Parts of the regiment also joined Kitchener's Horse.

Elements of the CGA were also involved in the attack on Jacobsdal on 25 October 1900.

During 1901 detachments of the regiment were often stationed alongside the Cape Town Highlanders as well as other local troops in the west of Cape Colony and other areas, up to the German South-West Africa border.

Other actions that elements of the CHA were involved in during the war were: Brugspruit (October 1900), Wonderfontein (February 1901), Naauwpoort (February 1901), Mafeking (November 1901), Omkyk (January 1902), Okiep (April 1902) and Daspoort near Pretoria (May 1902).

=== 1902-1913 ===
On 30 June 1902 the unit was demobilised, although it continued as a part-time volunteer unit. In 1904 Princess Christian presented the unit with a Kings Colour in Cape Town.

==== With the Union Defence Force ====
The CGA was embodied in the Coast Garrison Force of the Union Defence Force in 1913 as the 1st Division, South African Garrison Artillery (CGA). CGA manned batteries at Sea Point, Fort Wynyard and the Castle of Good Hope in Cape Town as well as at "Noah's Ark" and other batteries at Simon's Town.

=== 1914-1918 ===
Members of the CGA served with the Heavy Artillery Brigade in the German South-West Africa Campaign in 1915.

On the successful conclusion of the South-West Africa Campaign, many members of the CGA joined the Heavy Artillery Brigade of the South African Overseas Expeditionary Force, which served with great distinction in France and was later commemorated by the South African Heavy Artillery memorial below the Union Buildings in Pretoria.

From 1916 until the war ended, the CGA as such manned the Cape Peninsula defences.

=== 1919-1939 ===
Between the two world wars, the CGA was closely linked with the South African Permanent Garrison Artillery.

The approach of World War II led to the expansion of the South African military and in 1934 the Cape Garrison Artillery became 1 Heavy Battery (CGA) (in Cape Town) and 2 Heavy Battery (CGA) (in Simon's Town). They formed part of the Coast Artillery Brigade (later called the Cape Peninsula Artillery Brigade). A 5th Heavy Battery (CGA) was formed in 1938/39 to man the new batteries on Robben Island.

=== 1939-1945 ===
The batteries were mobilised on the outbreak of World War II in 1939, and manned the Cape coast defences throughout the war. An 8th Heavy Battery (CGA) was formed at Saldanha Bay in 1942. No South African port was actually attacked during the war; the only instance of a shot being fired in anger was when the Portuguese frigate Alfonse d'Albuquerque did not respond to signals when she passed a shore station. However, one round brought her to, and she was identified.

Many troops of the CGA were released for service in North Africa and Italy.

=== 1945-1958 ===
In 1951, the Cape Garrison Artillery batteries were renamed "coast regiments". 5th Heavy Battery was disbanded, but 1 Coast Regiment (CGA), 2 Coast Regiment (CGA) and 8 Coast Regiment (CGA) were transferred to the newly formed South African Corps of Marines, which was directed by the Navy. The SACM also controlled anti-aircraft units, and when the SACM disbanded in 1955, the anti-aircraft units were transferred to the Army, and the coast regiments were taken over by the Navy. The three CGA units were renamed SAS Ubique, SAS Diaz, and SAS Malgas. They were disbanded in 1958.

== Cape Garrison Artillery (2nd) ==
=== History ===
==== World War Two ====
South African home defences were strengthened during 1942, as a result of the threat posed by Japan. Among the new units that were formed were 50 Anti-Aircraft Battery at Saldanha Bay, 51 Anti-Aircraft Battery in Cape Town, and 52 Anti-Aircraft Battery in Simon's Town. These units were controlled by the South African Air Force until 1949, when they were transferred to the Army.

==== Union Defence Force ====
In 1951, the anti-aircraft units were transferred to the new South African Corps of Marines. When the SACM was disbanded in 1955, 50, 51 and 52 Anti-Aircraft Batteries were amalgamated to form 4 Heavy Anti-Aircraft Regiment.

==== Under the SADF ====
In 1960, 4 HAA was affiliated to the University of Cape Town under a new system designed to enable students to co-ordinate their studies and their military training. The regiment was renamed University of Cape Town Regiment. Although the "university regiment" system was discontinued when national service conscription was introduced in 1968, UCTR retained its name until 1974, when it was allowed to adopt the name of the former Cape Garrison Artillery.

===== Border War period =====
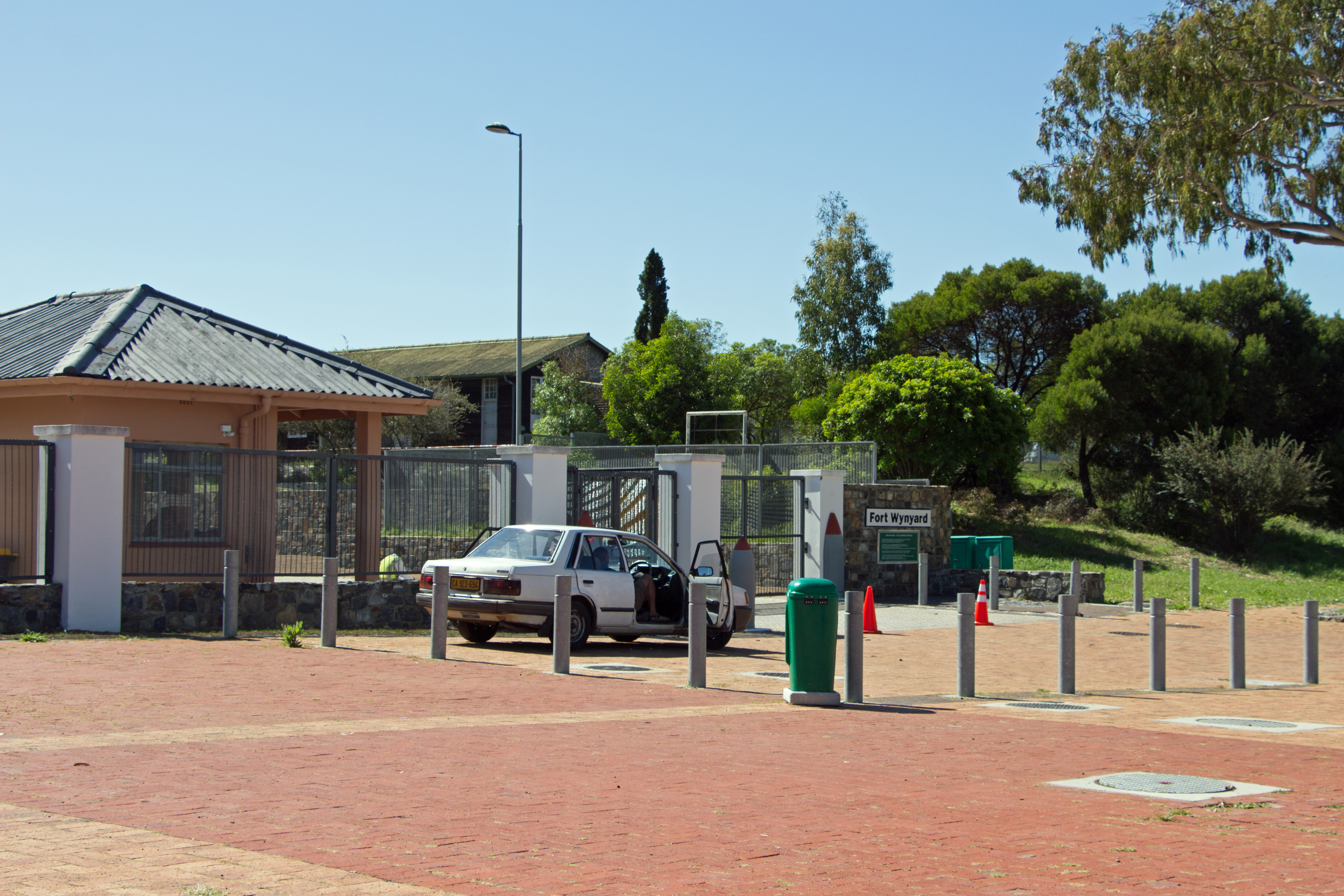
Fort Wynyard, site of the Cape Garrison Artillery headquarters

The CGA served in the Border War in the 1970s and 1980s under the command of 7 South African Infantry Division. Since the end of conscription in 1993, it has been a volunteer unit again, as part of the Reserve Force.

==== Under the SANDF ====
Since a 2005 revival initiative, the regiment now has become active in key initiatives such as Force Preparation, Force Support and Force Training, which are some of the current main focus areas of the South African National Defence Force.

The regiment is housed in Fort Wynyard. In December 2005, the regiment began an unofficial initiative to save the Fort from further decay.

In 2012 the sinking of the SS Mendi was commemorated at the University of Cape Town, with a memorial service hosted by the Cape Garrison Artillery.

The regiment became part of the South African Army Air Defence Artillery Formation which was formed in 1999.

=== Name Change ===
In August 2019, 52 Reserve Force units had their names changed to reflect the diverse military history of South Africa. The Cape Garrison Artillery became the Autshumato Anti-Aircraft Regiment, named for the Khoi chieftain and interpreter of that name, and have 3 years to design and implement new regimental insignia.

=== Leadership ===
Leadership
From	Honorary Colonels	To	Ribbon
n.d.	Col Sir De Villiers Graaff 2nd Baronet DMS,OBE	n.d.	Decoration for Meritorious Services DMS Order of the British Empire OBE
n.d.	Col Sir David Graaff, 3rd Baronet	24 January 2015	
25 January 2015	Vacant	Present	
From	Commanding Officers	To	Ribbon
c. 1899	Lt Col Sir David Pieter de Villiers Graaff, 1st Baronet	n.d.	
n.d.	Cmdt M v.d. Westhuizen	n.d.	
n.d.	Maj . V. Archer	n.d.	
n.d.	Lt Col Bob Visser	24 February 2018	
24 February 2018	Maj . M. Goetham	Current	
From	Regimental Sergeants Major	To	Ribbon
	No known incumbents		

=== Regimental Symbols ===
- As the Garrison Artillery and Engineer Volunteers (1891–96), the original regiment used the Cape Colony coat of arms and motto (Spes Bona) as its badge.
- Later, it adopted the standard artillery badge of a crowned field gun with the motto Quo Fas Et Gloria Ducunt (Where Right and Glory Lead).
- In the 1950s and 1960s, the current regiment wore the South African Artillery badge - also a field gun, but without the crown – with the coat of arms of the University of Cape Town on the wheel of the gun. Since the 1970s, the badge has been a field gun topped by a three-towered castle.
- The regiment's coat of arms, worn as a shoulder flash, is a shield which depicts a golden castle against a background divided per pale (vertically) into red and sky blue. It dates from the 1970s.
- The regiment received its National Colours during Exercise Genesis in 1992.

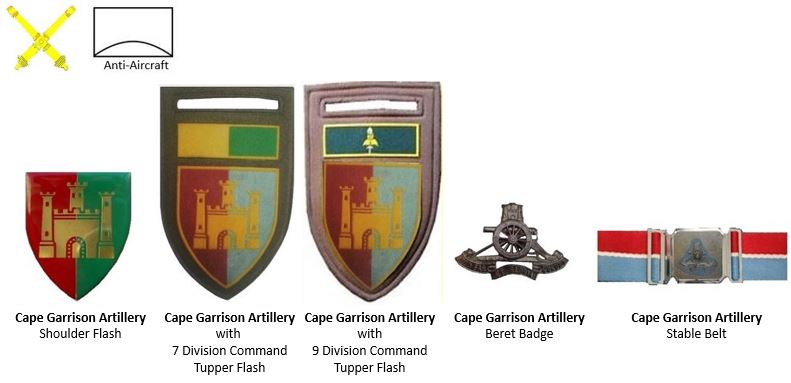
SADF era Cape Garrison Artillery insignia

=== King's Colour ===
In 1905, the original CGA was presented by a King's Colour in recognition of its service in the Anglo-Boer War.

=== Battle honours ===
The Unit saw service in the Transkei in 1880 during the Basutoland Rebellion

In 1927, the original CGA was awarded the battle honour "South West Africa 1915" for its service in the German South-West Africa Campaign.

The unit assembled in 1940 for service in Abyssinia, the Middle East and Italy and consisted of two heavy battery's and an anti aircraft battery.

The unit also saw service in early 1976 and took part in Operation Askari in 1984.

Battle Honours
Awarded to Cape Garrison Artillery
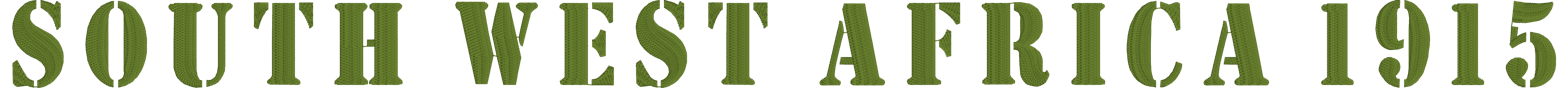

== Bibliography ==
- Hulme, J.J., Major JCD (June 1971). "Gallant Gentlemen 1855-1865: The Cape Colony Volunteers of a Century Ago". Military History Journal. 2 (1). The South African Military History Society. ISSN 0026-4016.
- Hulme, J.J., Major JCD (December 1972). "Cape Colonial Volunteer Corps (Part I)". Military History Journal. 2 (4). The South African Military History Society. ISSN 0026-4016.
- Hulme, J.J., Major JCD (June 1973). "Cape Colonial Volunteer Corps (Part II)". Military History Journal. 2 (5). The South African Military History Society. ISSN 0026-4016.
- Tylden, G, Major. The Armed Forces of South Africa 1659–1954. City of Johannesburg Africana Museum. Frank Connock Publication No.2. Facsimile 1982.
