= Sir David Graaff, 3rd Baronet =

Sir David Graaff Bt.
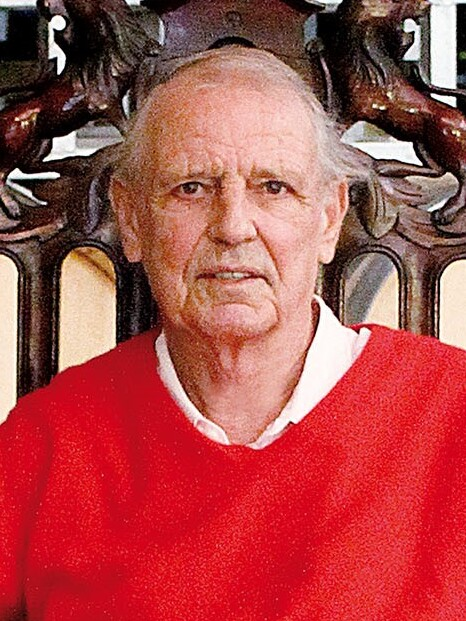
- Born: 3 May 1940; South Africa
- Died: 24 January 2015 (aged 74)
- Occupations: Businessman, politician, vintner

Personal details
- Party: National Party

Sir David de Villiers Graaff, 3rd Baronet (3 May 1940 – 24 January 2015), was a South African businessman and owner of De Grendel Wine Estate.

The son of Sir De Villiers Graaff, 2nd Baronet, he was born in 1940, after his father left to serve in the North African Campaign. Sir De Villiers became a prisoner of war in 1942, and would not meet his son until 1945. David took his undergraduate degree BSC Agric University of Stellenbosch, preparatory to a career in politics and farming, but also read politics, philosophy and economics at Magdalen College, Oxford and studied at the University of Grenoble. Like his father, he entered South African politics and served as the National Party Minister of Parliament for the Wynberg constituency in the late 1980s and Deputy Minister of Trade and Industry under FW De Klerk. He retired from Parliament after the 1999 general election.

When he inherited the baronetcy and the family estate of De Grendel upon his father's death, he decided to experiment with viticulture and winemaking. Sir David was a director of Graaffs Trust and The Milnerton Estates Limited.

He was the Honorary Colonel of the Cape Garrison Artillery until his death on 24 January 2015.

Sir David is survived by his wife Sally and his four children, the eldest of whom, De Villiers, succeeded him in the baronetcy and farming at De Grendel Estate.

Baronetage of the United Kingdom
Preceded by De Villiers Graaff	Baronet (of Tygerberg, South Africa); 1999–2015	Succeeded by De Villiers Graaff
Military offices
Unknown	Honorary Colonel Cape Garrison Artillery n.d – 2015	Unknown
