= Johannesburg Regiment =

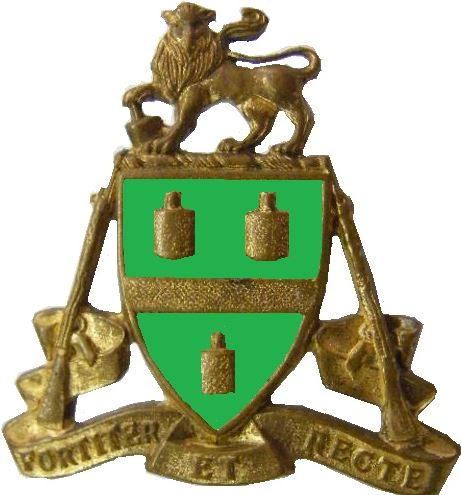
- SANDF Johannesburg Regiment emblem
- Active: 1 July 1951 to present
- Country: South Africa
- Allegiance: Republic of South Africa; Republic of South Africa
- Branch: South African Army; South African Army
- Role: Infantry
- Size: One Battalion
- Part of: South African Infantry Formation; Army Conventional Reserve
- Mottos: Fortiter et Recte (With Valour and Justice)
- Anniversaries: 1 March (Regimental Day)

Commanders
- Officer Commanding: Lt Col JN Nkosi
- Honorary Colonel: Col John Wilson
- Regimental Sgt Major: CWO BC Masombuka

Insignia
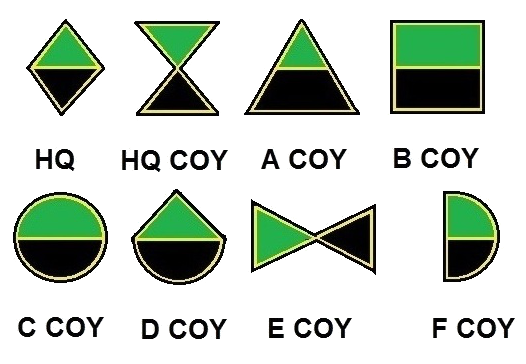
- Company level Insignia

- SA Motorised Infantry beret bar circa 1992: SA Motorised Infantry beret bar

The Johannesburg Regiment is an infantry regiment of the South African Army. As a reserve unit, it has a status roughly equivalent to that of a British Army Reserve or United States Army National Guard unit.

== History ==
=== Origins as Artillery ===
Johannesburg Regiment has been in existence since 1 July 1951. At the time it was an Artillery unit known as 8 Field Regiment South African Artillery. Colonel J. S. K. Brink was the Regiment's first commanding officer and following his retirement he became its honorary colonel. The Regiment's Headquarters were originally based at Auckland Park, where the current SABC offices are situated.

=== Re-mustered to Infantry ===
In February 1960, 8 Field Regiment disbanded and the unit officially became known as Johannesburg Regiment and was re mustered as an Infantry Regiment.

=== Regiment colours ===
In May 1962 the Johannesburg Municipality agreed that the Regiment could use the Municipal Coat of Arms as their Unit Emblem. Some minor changes were however done to the coat of arms, namely, the two sable antelope that acted as the supporters being replaced with two F.N. Rifles to give it a military touch. With this, the Regiment made history by being the first unit that used an F.N. Rifle in its armorial bearings. A badge that consists only of the shield, was also included. The motto is on a braid in Latin wording “Fortiter Et Recte” which means “With Valour and Justice”. The official Colour presentation parade was held at the Milnerpark Showgrounds stadium on 26 February 1966.

=== Operations ===
The Regiment mobilised for the first time in 1960 and saw initial service in Bloemfontein, Vereeniging and Sasolburg.

The Johannesburg Regiment has been actively involved in continuous and operational service since its founding in 1960.

=== Converted to Mechanised Infantry ===
The Regiment achieved a pinnacle in its history, becoming one of the first then citizen force units to be converted from a motorized to a mechanized unit in 1980 – the achievement occurred as the Regiment was voted the best unit in 72 Brigade on various evaluations during the year.

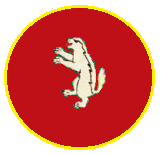
SADF era Johannesburg Regiment Outstanding Service badge with the ratel insignia denoting a mechanised unit (See 1 SAI emblems)

Subsequent successes include amongst others the following operations/ exercises: Madimbo, Savannah, Caterpillar, Protea, Thunder Chariot, Ops Eardrum, Ops Paal, Excalibur 1&2, Eagle Hill, Kwiksilwer, Vincity and Southern Cross.

=== Peace keeping ===
The Regiment has also successfully participated in peace operations in Africa.

In 2005 Johannesburg Regiment again made history when it provided troops for the first Reserve Company to be deployed in Peace Support Operations in the Democratic Republic of Congo (DRC).

== Freedom of the City ==
In November 1964 the City Council presented the Regiment with their Colours and six years later bestowed on it the honour of Freedom of Entrance to the city of Johannesburg. This was largely due to the efforts of Councillor J. D. Opperman who became the unit's Honorary Colonel in 1979 until he died on 20 April 2000. The Unit Colours were officially handed over on 26 February 1966. National Colours were awarded to the Unit on 5 October 1991, and laid up in April 1994.

== The Regiment today ==
=== Current command structure ===
1. Honorary Colonel : Col John Wilson
2. Chaplain : Currently Vacant
3. RSM : Currently Vacant
4. Second-in-Command: Maj. M.J. Keretetse
5. Officer Commanding: Lt. Col. Ligaraba

=== Unit strengths ===
The Regiment is an active Regiment, with strong ties between the Unit, Sister Regiments and Higher HQ. Currently the unit is actively recruiting and training. The unit is supported by a strong, active Association and a widespread network of old boys. The Unit is also settled in proper Headquarters, and has the services of a permanent clerical assistant.

=== General activities ===
The unit hosts a parade annually on the first Sunday in March. Traditionally this takes place in Johannesburg, as the Regiment has Freedom of Entry to the City. This parade also serves to commemorate the birthday of the Regiment, and is dedicated to the memory of all members of the regiment that has paid the highest price in defence of our country. A medal parade is also planned for annually, but is only held when applicable. The Regiment also participates in the annual "Poppy Day" parade in November. This event is always well supported by the regiment, as well as the Association.

The Association hosts a Semi Formal dinner annually. An annual golf day fund raiser rounds off the ongoing activities.

The Association also supports the Military Associations of Gauteng, and one of the highlights every year is the MAG picnic at the War Museum. the Associations meets once a months and the main purpose is still to support the Regiment.

== Regimental symbols ==
In May 1962 the Johannesburg City Council gave permission to the unit to use the Johannesburg City Coat of Arms as the Regimental badge. The cap badge shows minor differences to the original, as the antelope supporting the shield was substituted with 2 F. N. Rifles. The lapel badge consists of the shield portion of the cap badge. The motto is in Latin: "FORTITER ET RECTE" loosely translated this means: With Valour and Justice.

=== Previous dress insignia ===
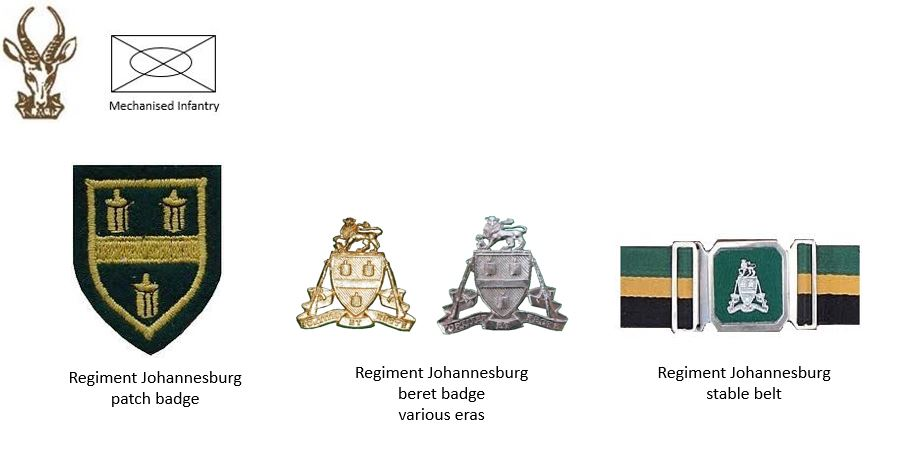
SADF era Johannesburg Regiment insignia

=== Current dress insignia ===
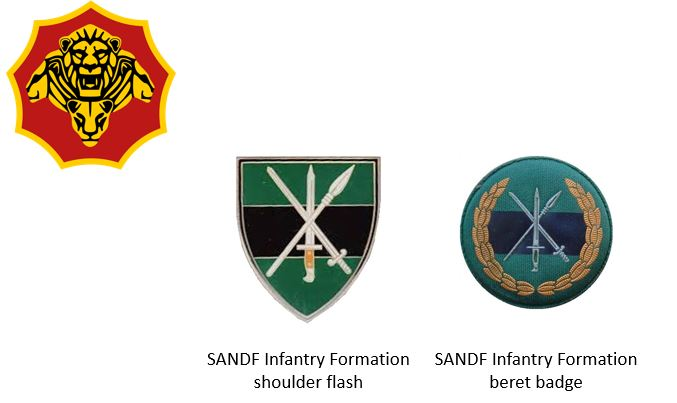
SANDF era Infantry Formation insignia

== Battle Honours ==
Although the Regiment saw active duty both inside and outside the borders of South Africa, it never participated in a battle worthy of Battle Honors as a Regiment. Many of its members though were part of other formations that did earn Battle Honours.

Leadership
From	Honorary Colonel	To	Ribbon
n.d.	Col J.S.K. Brink	1979	
1979	Col JD Opperman	20 April 2000	
20 April 2000	Col John Wilson	Present	
From	Commanding Officer	To	Ribbon
1 July 1951	Col J.S.K. Brink	n.d.	
1960	Cmdt B. Pretorius	1964	
1964	Cmdt S. Van der Merwe	1968	
1971	Cmdt D. Pretorius	1976	
1976	Cmdt J. Swart	1982	
1982	Cmdt J.H. Swanepoel	1985	
1985	Cmdt L. Harding	1989	
1989	Lt Col H. van Staden	2000	
2000	Lt Col J. L. Immelman	2010	
2010	Lt Col J Tshabalala	2012	
2012	Lt Col D Motsemai	2017	
2017	OC (Note: Acting (Temporarily holding the post without confirmation))	2018	
2018	Lt Col JN Nkosi	2024	
2018	Lt Col DSS Senkhane	2026	
2026	Lt Col RP Ligaraba	Present	
From	Regimental Sergeant Major	To	Ribbon
1960	WO1 J Hauptfleisch	1969	
1969	WO1 M. P. Bezuidenhoudt	1975	
1976	WO1 J. D. van Heerden	1980	
1980	WO1 J. A. Vorster	1985	
1985	WO1 P. J. Mostert	1990	
1990	WO1 J. A. D. Viljoen	1993	
1993	WO1 Jan Oosthuisen	2005	
2005	WO1 J. A. van Straaten	2006	
2006	CMW Jan Oosthuisen	2016	
2017	CMW MS Dlamini	2020	
2020	CMW BC Masombuka	2025	
2020	ACTING RSM MW DJ Radebe	present	
