= Regiment Boland =

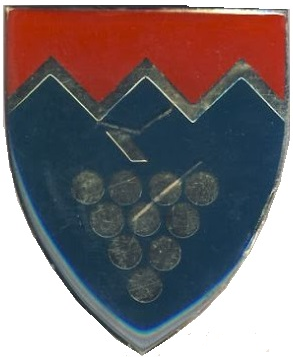
- Regiment Boland emblem
- Active: 1 April 1934 to 1997
- Country: South Africa
- Allegiance: Republic of South Africa
- Branch: South African Army
- Type: Infantry
- Role: Motorised Infantry
- Size: One Battalion
- Part of: South African Infantry Corps; Army Conventional Reserve
- Garrison/HQ: Worcester, Western Cape
- Anniversaries: 1 April 1934

Insignia
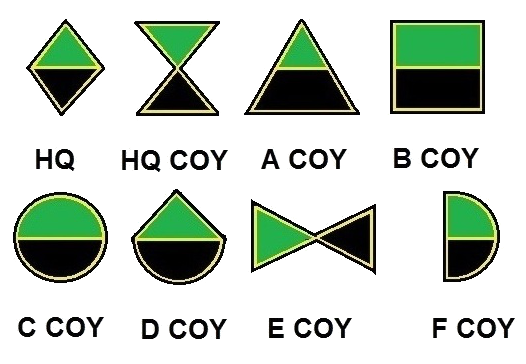
- Company level Insignia

- SA Motorised Infantry beret bar circa 1992: SA Motorised Infantry beret bar

Regiment Boland was an infantry regiment of the South African Army. As a reserve unit, it had a status roughly equivalent to that of a British Territorial Army or United States Army National Guard unit.

== History ==
=== Origin ===
Regiment Boland traced its ancestry back to Regiment Westelike Provincie (RWP) (now called Regiment Westelike Provinsie), which was one of the Afrikaner-oriented units that was raised by the Union Defence Force in 1934. RWP was renamed Regiment Onze Jan in 1951, only to be changed again in 1960, to Regiment Boland.

=== The second battalion ===
The Regiment acquired a second battalion in 1972, with the 1st Battalion being headquartered at Paarl and the 2nd Battalion at Worcester.

=== 71 Brigade ===
When 71 Infantry Brigade was formed in August 1974 as a separate formation, the Cape Town Rifles (Dukes) remained with Western Province Command and Regiment Westelike Provincie joined Regiment Boland and the Cape Town Highlanders as the infantry battalions of the brigade.

Regiment Boland was therefore transferred to Western Province Command as a counter-insurgency battalion in July 1986 after it had been replaced by Cape Town Rifles (Dukes) in early 1984.

However, the 1st Battalion fought to regain their original name and this succeeded in 1974, when the two battalions became independent units - the 1st Battalion became Regiment Westelike Provincie and was headquartered in Cape Town, while the 2nd Battalion retained the designation Regiment Boland. The only remnant of their association was the similar cap-badges of the two Regiments.

=== Disbandment ===
Regiment Boland was disbanded in 1997.

== Regimental Symbols ==
=== Dress Insignia ===
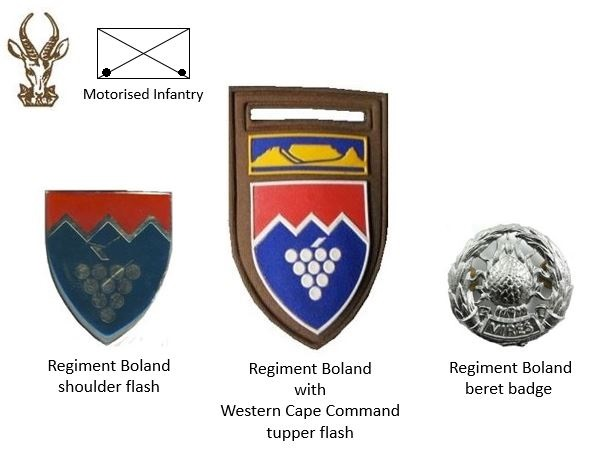
SADF era Regiment Boland insignia
