= Carel Laubscher =

General Officer in the South African Army

Brigadier General Carel Christiaan Laubscher MMM
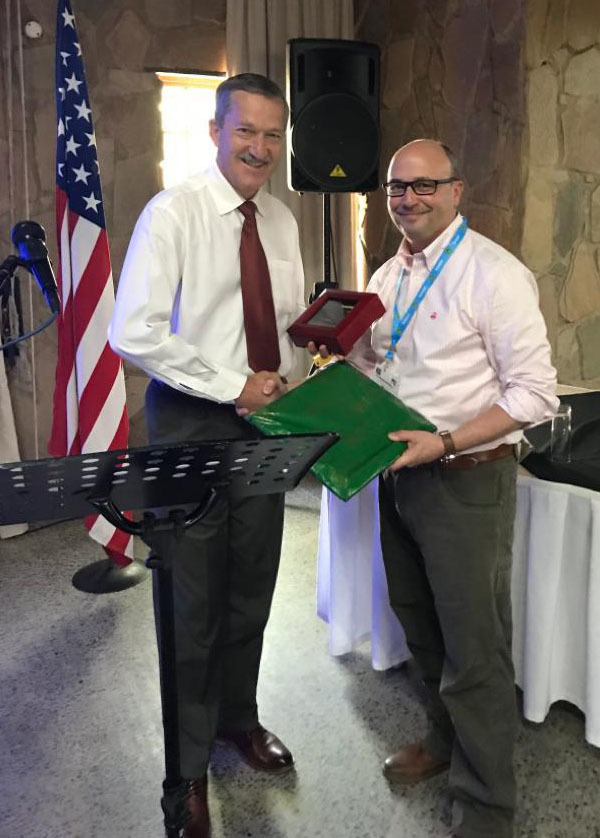
- Born: 1961 (age 64–65)
- Relatives: Maj Gen Koos Laubscher SM & Bar MMM (older brother)
- Military career
- Allegiance: South Africa
- Branch: South African Army
- Service years: 1979–2021
- Rank: Brigadier General
- Unit: 4 Artillery Regiment
- Commands: Director Training System Integrity, SANDF; A/COS Artillery Formation; SSO Force Preparation, Artillery Formation; OC 14 Artillery Regiment
- Conflicts: South African Border War
- Awards: Military Merit Medal MMM Pro Patria Medal Southern Africa Medal General Service Medal (South Africa) Unitas (Unity) Medal Medalje vir Troue Diens (Medal for Loyal Service) Good Service Medal

Brig Gen Carel Laubscher MMM was a General Officer in the South African Army from the artillery.

== Military career ==
He joined the SADF as a Conscript in 1979 and was commissioned as an Officer in 1982. Appointed as Adjutant at 10 Artillery Brigade. He was a Battery Commander at Sierra Battery of 61 Mechanised Battalion Group during 1989–1990. He was appointed as Officer Commanding of 14 Artillery Regiment in Jan 1991. He served as the Chief Instructor Gunnery at the School of Artillery during 1994–1996 and member of the Directing Staff at the South African Army College in 1996. Much later, he served as the SSO Force Preparation for the Artillery Formation from 1999 to 2003, SSO Education Training & Development for the SA Army 2004–2008. SSO Quality Assurance for the SANDF at Human Resources Division in 2008. His last posting was as Director of Training Systems Integrity until he retired from the SANDF in 2021.

== Honours and awards ==
=== Medals ===
- Military Merit Medal (MMM)
- Pro Patria Medal
- Southern Africa Medal
- General Service Medal (South Africa)
- Unitas (Unity) Medal
- Medalje vir Troue Diens (Medal for Loyal Service) (40 Year Clasp)
- Medalje vir Troue Diens (Medal for Loyal Service) (30 Year Clasp)
- Good Service Medal (Silver (20 Years))
- Good Service Medal (Bronze (10 Years))

=== Proficiency badges ===
Master Gunner #66 Master Gunner badge Lt Colonel; Carel C. Laubscher (Note: Post occupied when award was made: Chief Instructor, Gunnery (CIG)) Year: 1995: ← #65; Lt Colonel; Ralph Brian Mills / #67 → Captain; J. Daniel A. Crafford	Free Fall Paratrooper (Qualification) Advanced, Freefall. Black on Thatch beige. Small Black wings	61 Mech Operational Service Badge (Service) Black on Thatch beige, Embossed. Rectangular bar (upright) with a black dagger and three black lightning flashes angled diagonally across the blade

== Notes ==
Military offices
Preceded by New	SSO Force Preparation, Artillery Formation; 1999–2003	Succeeded by Col Andy Oelofse
Preceded by Lt Col Deon Holtzhausen	OC 14 Artillery Regiment; 1991–1992	Succeeded by disbanded
Honorary titles
Preceded by Lt Col Ralph Brian Mills	66th Master Gunner; 1995	Succeeded by Capt Daniel Crafford
