= F.M. Hurter =

South African Army officer (1942–2021)

Brigadier General F.M. Hurter SM MMM
- Born: Felix Marius Hurter; 28 June 1942; Port Elizabeth
- Died: 24 May 2021 (aged 78)
- Military career
- Allegiance: South Africa
- Branch: South African Army
- Service years: 4 January 1962–October 1994
- Rank: Brigadier General
- Nickname: Baksteen
- Unit: 10 Field Battery
- Commands: OC 8 SA Division; OC 10 Artillery Brigade; OC 14 Field Regiment; Battery Commander 1 Medium Battery, 4 Field Regiment
- Conflicts: Operation Savannah 1975
- Awards: Southern Cross Medal SM Military Merit Medal MMM Pro Patria Medal (South Africa) Southern Africa Medal General Service Medal (South Africa) Unitas (Unity) Medal Good Service Medal

Brigadier General Felix Marius Hurter SM MMM (28 June 1942 – 24 May 2021 (aged 78)) was a General Officer in the South African Army from the artillery. He was born in Port Elizabeth on 28 June 1942.

== Military career ==
He was born on 28 June 1942 in Port Elizabeth and joined the Artillery as a National Serviceman on 4 January 1962. He was assigned to 10 Field Battery and completed his National Service nine months later as a member of 143 Battery in September 1962. During that time he had been commissioned as an Assistant Field Cornet, the equivalent to a second lieutenant.

In 1963 he was admitted as a student to the South African Military Academy and graduated with a Bachelor of Military Science degree awarded by the University of Stellenbosch in 1965. In January of that year he was promoted to lieutenant (First Lieutenant).

Then Lt Hurter's first posting was to Bethlehem where he was assigned to 14 Field Regiment as an OPO. Some time after this he managed to attend and complete the military parachutist course.

In 1967, he was assigned as Adjutant to then Commandant Jack Hawtayne at 4 Field Training Regiment and received his promotion to the rank of captain in January 1968. Captain Hurter's next posting was to Army Headquarters, where from 1968 to 1969 he was the Army Air Liaison Officer on that HQ staff.

Captain Hurter's first command came in January 1970 when he was appointed to the post of Battery Commander, commanding 1 Medium Battery, 4 Field Regiment until the end of 1970.

The beginning of the next year saw Captain Hurter receive his Majority. He was promoted to the rank of Major on the first of January 1971. Along with the promotion came a transfer to a new appointment, this time as Chief Instructor National Services at the School of Artillery in which post he served until December 1973.

Major Hurter completed the 3^{rd} South African Long Gunnery Course from 5 June to 15 December 1972. This course grandfathered him in to become a recipient later of the Master Gunner badge.

During 1974 he served as the Chief Instructor - Regimental Training Wing, taking time out from that post to complete the 43^{rd} SA Army Senior Command and Staff Duties Course from 5 July 1974 to 28 March 1975. He then ended up serving as a member of the Controlling Staff, SA Army College from 1975 to 1977.

1975 brought with it the first major combat of the South African Border War and Major Hurter was selected to serve in the operational theatre as the Commander of the 88 mm (3.5 in) and 140 mm (5.5 in) guns which were combined to form the Field Battery of Combat Group Alpha for the duration of Operation Savannah that year. An anecdotal story is told of one of his actions during the conflict which bears repeating:

Ek sien in my geestesoog nog hoe Felix met ‘’n erg beseerde Dave Wessels HC van die Geniekorps in sy arms, van die rivier af, op ‘’n drafstap teen die steil paadjie aankom en Dave na veiligheid dra. Brute krag en adrenalien laat dit so maklik lyk! I still see in my mind's eye how Felix arrived at a running pace along the steep path from the river, carrying a severely injured Dave Wessels HC of the Engineering Corps in his arms and taking him to safety. Brutal strength and adrenaline made it look so easy!

He was promoted to the rank of commandant on 1 Jan 1978, and posted immediately to become the First Artillery Branch Commander, Army Battle School in January 1978 and served in that post until December 1979. After that he was appointed as the Officer Commanding 14 Field Regiment where he commanded from 7 January 1980 until 3 January 1982.

He was promoted to the rank of Colonel on 1 January 1982 and appointed as the Courses Branch Commander in Lohatla for the period of January 1982 to December 1983. He was appointed Second in Command of the Army Battle School and served in that post from January 1984 until December 1985.

Col Hurter completed the 16^{th} SADF Joint Staff Course in 1985.

He was appointed as the Officer Commanding 10 Artillery Brigade from the 12 January to 31 December 1986, then Chief of Staff, North-Western Command from January to December 1987.

He was promoted to the rank of Brigadier (Note: This was at the time a General Officer rank, which later was renamed as Brigadier General) on the 1 January 1988, then appointed as the Chief of Staff Eastern Transvaal Command in which post he served from 1988 to 1992.

Brigadier Hurter completed the Special Joint Staff Course 18/92.

He received his final command appointment as the General Officer Commanding 8 SA Division in Durban which he commanded from January to December 1993.

During January 1994, he was involved in the negotiations surrounding the integration of the various armed forces into the new SANDF, inter alia heading a team tasked to establish the Wallmansthal Military Assembly Area.

General Hurter was renowned throughout his career for his physical strength, a fact reflected in his nickname of Baksteen (Brick), as well as his mental flexibility and insatiable curiosity.

In October 1994, he went on early retirement at the age of 52. He died on the 24 May 2021 (aged 78)

== Honours and awards ==
=== Medals ===
- Southern Cross Medal (1975) (SM)
- Military Merit Medal (MMM)
- Pro Patria Medal (South Africa) (with Cunene Clasp) (Note: Only the Cunene clasp was awarded, to members who served in Angola during Operation Savannah in 1975 and 1976. Recipients of the clasp wear a button, with the letter C encircled by a wreath, on the ribbon bar.)
- Southern Africa Medal
- General Service Medal (South Africa)
- Unitas (Unity) Medal
- Good Service Medal (Gold (30 Years))
- Good Service Medal (Silver (20 Years))
- Good Service Medal (Bronze (10 Years))

=== Proficiency badges ===
Proficiency badges
Master Gunner #31 Master Gunner badge Major; Felix Marius 'Baksteen' Hurter (Note: Post occupied when award was made: OI, School of Artillery) (Note: Maj Hurter completed the 3rd South African Long Gunnery Course from the 5 Jun-15 Dec 1972) Year: 1972: ← #30; Captain; J.A. 'Koos' Laubscher / #32 → Captain; P.R.B. du Plessis	Paratrooper Basic (Qualification) Basic, Static Line. Black on Thatch beige, Embossed. Small Black wings

== Notes ==
Military offices
Unknown	Army Air Liaison Officer, Army HQ; 1968–1969	Unknown
Unknown	Battery Commander; 1 Medium Battery, 4 Field Regiment; January 1970–December 1970	Unknown
Unknown	Chief Instructor National Services: School of Artillery; January 1971–December 1973	Unknown
Preceded by New	Branch Commander: Army Battle School; January 1978–December 1979	Succeeded by Koos Laubscher
Preceded by Ferdi van Wyk	OC 14 Field Regiment; 7 Jan 1980–3 Jan 1982	Succeeded by Faan Bothma
Unknown	Courses Branch Commander (Lohatla); January 1982–December 1983	Succeeded by Mos Grobler
Unknown	2IC Army Battle School; January 1984–December 1985	Unknown
Preceded by Chris Human	OC 10 Artillery Brigade; 12 Jan 1986–31 Dec 1986	Succeeded by Jean Lausberg
Unknown	Chief of Staff, North Western Command; Jan 1987–Dec 1987	Unknown
Unknown	Chief of Staff, Eastern Transvaal Command; 1988–1992	Unknown
Unknown	OC 8 SA Division; Jan 1993–Dec 1993	Succeeded by Louis Rheeder
Honorary titles
Preceded by Captain Koos Laubscher	31^{st} Master Gunner; 1972	Succeeded by Captain Phillip du Plessis
