= Deon Holtzhausen =

Major General Hendrik Gideon Holtzhausen SM MMM
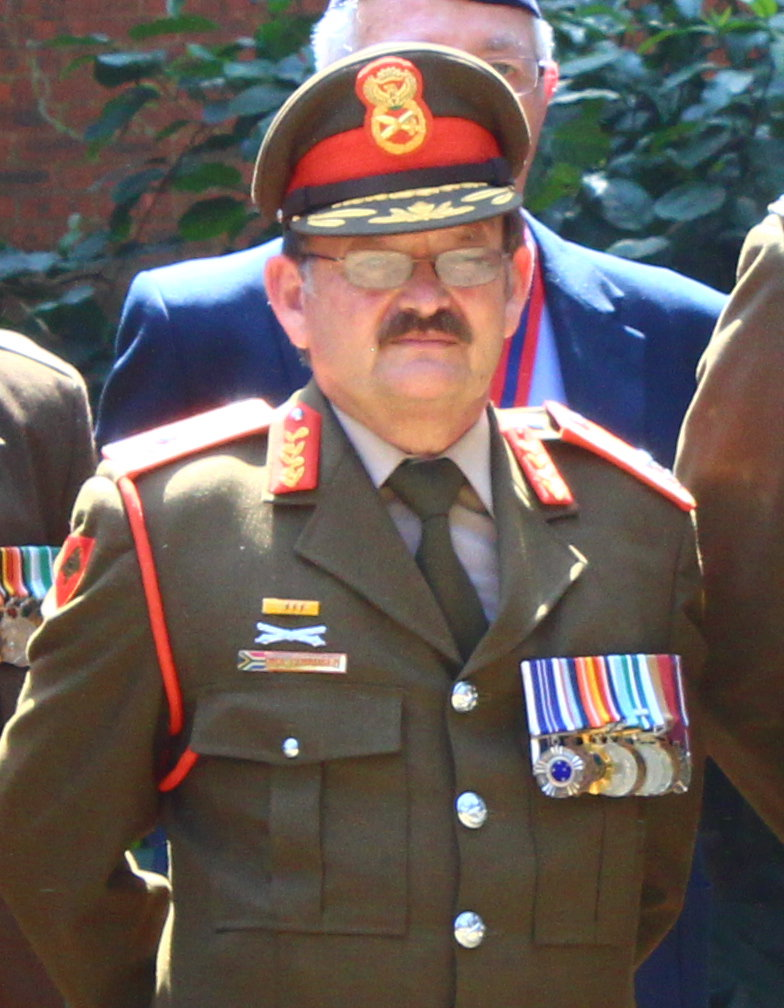
- Brig Gen Deon Holtzhausen at the Gunner's Memorial in Durban 2014
- Born: Gideon; 1958 (age 67–68); Wolmaranstad
- Military career
- Allegiance: South Africa
- Branch: South African Army
- Service years: 1976–2018
- Rank: Major General
- Nickname: Deon
- Service number: 74223900PE
- Unit: 4 Artillery Regiment
- Commands: Chief Director Army Force Structure; GOC Artillery Formation; CoS SA Army Training Fmn; OC 4 Artillery Regiment; 2IC 4 Artillery Regiment; 2IC 10 Artillery Brigade; OC 14 Artillery Regiment
- Conflicts: South African Border War
- Awards: Southern Cross Medal SM Military Merit Medal MMM Pro Patria Medal Southern Africa Medal General Service Medal (South Africa) Unitas (Unity) Medal Mandela Commemoration Medal Medalje vir Troue Diens (Medal for Loyal Service) Good Service Medal

Deon Holtzhausen SM MMM was a general officer in the South African Army and general officer commanding the South African Army Artillery Formation. and later the chief of army force structure on the staff on the Chief of the Army.

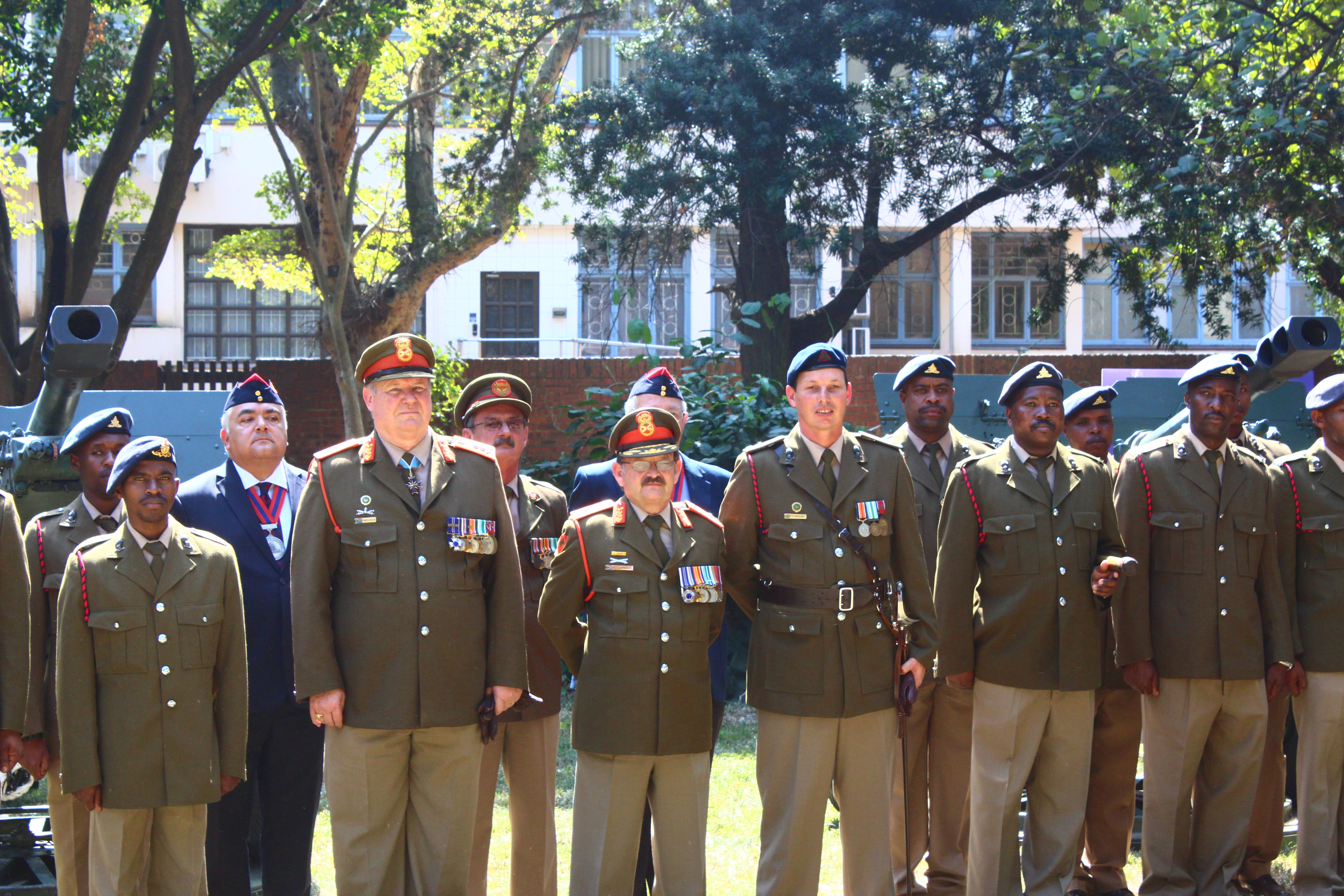
Maj Gen Roy Andersen with the GOC, Brig Gen Deon Holtzhausen, and Sgt Maj of the Formation accompanied by the NFA OC, Major Craig Nel, just after the NFA gunners fired the salute at the Gunner's Memorial Service in Durban 2014

== Military career ==
He joined the SADF in 1976. He was commissioned as an officer and subsequently served as battery commander at 14 Field Regiment, first as the unit Second in Command then taking command as the OC 14 Artillery Regiment. He completed the SA Army Senior Staff Course in 1991. After that he was appointed second-in-command of 10 Artillery Brigade, OC 4 Artillery Regiment. He completed the Joint Services Staff College course in 1998. He was a staff officer in the Army Headquarters in 1998–2001. Chief of Staff Training Formation during 2001 to 2011. He did a stint as a Defence Advisor to the Kingdom of Saudi Arabia from February 2011 until January 2012. He was promoted to brigadier general on 1 November 2011 and appointed as general-officer-commanding SA Army Artillery Formation on 1 February 2012.

He was subsequently promoted to major general and appointed as the Chief llDirector: Army Force Structures in January 2016. He retired on 28 February 2018.

== Honours and awards ==
=== Medals ===
- Southern Cross Medal (1975) (SM)
- Military Merit Medal (MMM)
- Pro Patria Medal
- Southern Africa Medal
- General Service Medal (South Africa)
- Unitas (Unity) Medal
- Mandela Commemoration Medal (Silver)
- Medalje vir Troue Diens (Medal for Loyal Service) (40 Year Clasp)
- Medalje vir Troue Diens (Medal for Loyal Service) (30 Year Clasp)
- Good Service Medal (Silver (20 Years))
- Good Service Medal (Bronze (10 Years))
- Order Military Merit (Grand Cross) (Paraguay)

=== Proficiency badges ===
Proficiency badges
Master Gunner #63 Master Gunner badge Commandant; H.G. 'Deon' Holtzhausen (Note: Post occupied when award was made: Officer Commanding, 14 Artillery Regiment) Year: 1990: ← #62; Commandant; J.W. 'Jackie' Potgieter / #64 → Lt Colonel; Leon Phillipson	61 Mech Operational Service Badge (Service) Black on Thatch beige, Embossed. Rectangular bar (upright) with a black dagger and three black lightning flashes angled diagonally across the blade

== Notes ==
Military offices
Preceded by Maj Gen Spinks Nobanda	Chief of Army Force Structures; 2016–2018	Succeeded by Maj Gen Willis Nkosi
Preceded by Brig Gen Abe Notshweleka	GOC Artillery Formation; 2012–2015	Succeeded by Brig Gen Khaya Makina
Preceded by Col Koos Stadler	Defence Advisor to Saudi Arabia; 2011–2012	Unknown
Preceded by Col Chris Roux	OC 4 Artillery Regiment; 1995–1997	Succeeded by Lt Col Phillip van Dyk
Preceded by Maj Leon Phillipson	2IC 4 Artillery Regiment; 1993–1994	Succeeded by Lt Col Cassie van der Merwe (soldier)
Preceded by Lt Col Ian Johnson	2IC 10 Artillery Brigade; 1991–1992	Disbanded
Preceded by Lt Col George Swanepoel	OC 14 Artillery Regiment; 1989–1990	Succeeded by Lt Col Carel Laubscher
Honorary titles
Preceded by Jakkie Potgieter	63rd Master Gunner	Succeeded by Leon Phillipson
