= Koos Laubscher =

General Officer in the South African Army

Major General Jacobus Laubscher SM & Bar MMM
- Born: 1945 (age 80–81)
- Relatives: Brig Gen Carel Laubscher MMM (younger brother)
- Military career
- Allegiance: South Africa
- Branch: South African Army
- Service years: 1964–2005
- Rank: Major General
- Nickname: Koos
- Unit: 4 Artillery Regiment
- Commands: GOC Army Support Formation; OC 7 Division; Commandant Army College; Director of Artillery; OC School of Artillery; OC 4 Artillery Regiment
- Wars: South African Border War
- Awards: Southern Cross Medal SM & Bar Military Merit Medal MMM Pro Patria Medal (South Africa) Southern Africa Medal General Service Medal (South Africa) Unitas (Unity) Medal Medalje vir Troue Diens (Medal for Loyal Service) Good Service Medal

Maj Gen Koos Laubscher SM & Bar MMM (Born 1945) was a General Officer in the South African Army from the artillery.

== Military career ==
He joined the South African Defence Force in 1964. He was a graduate of the South African Military Academy and the prestigious South African Long Gunnery Course Number 3 as a top student during 1972 and was awarded the crossed-barrels status the same year. He passed the SA Army Senior Command and Staff Duties Course in 1975 and the Joint Staff Course at the Defence College during 1989. He saw action in Angola during Operation Savannah in 1975–76 and throughout the South African Border War including the operational debut of the G5 155mm towed gun/howitzer in the Angolan theatre of war during the eighties. Chief Instructor Gunnery at School of Artillery from 1975. He was an officer instructor at the South African Army College and the Army Battle School, OC 4 Artillery Regiment from 1981 to 1982, OC School of Artillery and later Director of Artillery from 1987 to 1991, Commandant of the Army College in 1993. He served as GOC 7 Division from 1996 to 1998. GOC Army Support Formation from 1999 to 2005. He retired from the SANDF in 2005.

== Honours and awards ==
=== Medals ===
- Southern Cross Medal (1975) (SM & Bar)
- Military Merit Medal (MMM)
- Pro Patria Medal (South Africa) (with Cunene Clasp) (Note: Only the Cunene clasp was awarded, to members who served in Angola during Operation Savannah in 1975 and 1976. Recipients of the clasp wear a button, with the letter C encircled by a wreath, on the ribbon bar.)
- Southern Africa Medal
- General Service Medal (South Africa)
- Unitas (Unity) Medal
- Medalje vir Troue Diens (Medal for Loyal Service) (40 Year Clasp)
- Good Service Medal (Gold (30 Years))
- Good Service Medal (Silver (20 Years))
- Good Service Medal (Bronze (10 Years))

=== Proficiency badges ===
| Master Gunner #30 Master Gunner badge Captain; J.A. 'Koos' Laubscher (Note: Post occupied when award was made: OI, School of Artillery) Year: 1972: ← #29; Major; W. 'Willie' Wentzel / #31 → Major; Felix Marius 'Baksteen' Hurter | General of the Gunners (Post) Black on Thatch beige, Embossed. Crossed gun barrels with grenade | Paratrooper Basic (Qualification) Basic, Static Line. Black on Thatch beige, Embossed. Small Black wings |

== Notes ==
Honorary titles
| Preceded by Maj Gen Chris van Zyl | General of the Artillery; 2002–2005 | Succeeded by Maj Gen Roy Andersen |
| Preceded by Maj Willie Wentzel | 30th Master Gunner; 1972 | Succeeded by Maj Felix Hurter |
Military offices
| Preceded by New | GOC Army Supp Formation; 1999–2005 | Succeeded by Maj Gen Robert Mandita |
| Preceded by Brig Roland de Vries | GOC 7 Division; 1995–1998 | Succeeded by disbanded |
| Preceded by Col PC de B. Venter | Director Artillery; 1987–1991 | Succeeded by Col Jakes Jacobs |
| Preceded by Col Charles Wentzel | OC School of Artillery; 1983–1987 | Succeeded by Col Jakes Jacobs |
| Preceded by Cmdt PC de B. Venter | OC 4 Artillery Regiment; 1981–1982 | Succeeded by Cmdt Jacob van Heerden |
