= Chris Venter =

South African Army officer (born 1943)

Major General Pieter Christoffel de Beer Venter SM & Bar
- Born: Springfontein, Free State; 1943 (age 82–83)
- Military career
- Allegiance: South Africa
- Branch: South African Army
- Service years: 1962–1998
- Rank: Major General
- Nickname: Chris
- Unit: 14 Field Regiment
- Commands: Director of Artillery; OC 4 Artillery Regiment
- Conflicts: South African Border War
- Awards: Southern Cross Medal SM & Bar Pro Patria Medal (South Africa) General Service Medal (South Africa) Unitas (Unity) Medal Good Service Medal
- Other work: National Chairman of the SA Gunner's Association

Maj Gen Chris Venter SM & Bar was a South African Army general officer from the artillery who served as the last Chief of Army Staff Planning (GS6).

== Military career ==
He joined the South African Defence Force in 1962 and served at 14 Field Regiment, 4 Field Regiment and the School of Artillery where he was a Chief Instructor Gunnery in 1974. He was involved in Operation Savannah in 1975-76. He was appointed as OC 4 Artillery Regiment from 1978 to 1980. He served as Director of Artillery from 1983-1986. Brigadier Venter served as Director Management Services and after promotion to the rank of major general, he served as Chief of Army Staff Planning for the SANDF in 1997 to 1998. He retired from the SANDF in 1998. He served from 1998 to 2005 as the National Chairman of the South African Gunner's Association.

== Honours and awards ==
=== Medals ===
- Southern Cross Medal (1975) (SM & Bar)
- Pro Patria Medal (South Africa) (with Cunene Clasp) (Note: Only the Cunene clasp was awarded, to members who served in Angola during Operation Savannah in 1975 and 1976. Recipients of the clasp wear a button, with the letter C encircled by a wreath, on the ribbon bar.)
- General Service Medal (South Africa)
- Unitas (Unity) Medal
- Good Service Medal (Gold (30 Years))
- Good Service Medal (Silver (20 Years))
- Good Service Medal (Bronze (10 Years))

=== Proficiency badges ===
Proficiency badges
Master Gunner #38 Master Gunner badge Major; P.C. 'Chris' de Beer Venter (Note: Post occupied when award was made: Battery Commander, 1 Medium Battery, 4 Field Artillery) Year: 1972: ← #37; Major; Steve van Aswegen / #39 → Captain; Jack C.D.F. Bosch	Paratrooper Basic (Qualification) Basic, Static Line. Black on Thatch beige, Embossed. Small Black wings

== Notes ==
Military offices
Preceded by Col Joffel vd Westhuizen	Director Artillery; 1983–1986	Succeeded by Col Koos Laubscher
Preceded by Lt Col Vossie Nell	OC 4 Artillery Regiment; 1978–1980	Succeeded by Lt Col Koos Laubscher
Preceded by Maj Joffel van der Westhuizen	Chief Instructor Gunnery; 1973–1975	Succeeded by Capt Koos Laubscher
Honorary titles
Preceded by Steve van Aswegen	38th Master Gunner; 1972	Succeeded by Jack Bosch
