= Joffel van der Westhuizen =

Lieutenant General Christoffel Pierre van der Westhuizen SD, SM, MMM
- Born: Christoffel Pierre van der Westhuizen; 7 February 1942 (age 84); Kroonstad, Orange Free State
- Military career
- Allegiance: South Africa; South Africa
- Branch: South African Army
- Service years: 1961–1994
- Rank: Lieutenant General
- Nickname: Joffel
- Unit: 14 Field Regiment
- Commands: Chief of Staff Intelligence; Deputy Chief of the Army; GOC Wits Command; OC EP Command; Director of Artillery; OC 14 Field Regiment
- Conflicts: Border War
- Awards: Southern Cross Decoration SD Southern Cross Medal SM Military Merit Medal MMM Pro Patria Medal (South Africa) General Service Medal (South Africa) Good Service Medal Order of the Cloud and Banner ORB
- Other work: Author

Lieutenant General Christoffel Pierre "Joffel" van der Westhuizen (born 7 February 1942) is a South African Army general from the artillery, who served as Chief of Staff Intelligence for the Defence Force from 1991 – 1994.

== Military career ==
He served in the artillery as a junior officer at 14 Field Regiment and as Adjutant at the School of Artillery. Chief Instructor Gunnery from 1971-1972. Second in Command 4 Field Regiment in 1973. OC 14 Field Regiment from 1974 which he led throughout Operation Savannah. Senior staff officer at Army Headquarters from 1976-1981 while seconded to ARMSCOR. Director Artillery during 1982. As a brigadier, he served as the OC Eastern Province Command in 1983 – 1987. GOC Witwatersrand Command in 1987 - 1990. He served as Deputy Chief of the Army in 1990 until he was appointed to the Military Intelligence Division in 1991 as the Chief of Staff Intelligence, a post he held until 1994. He went on early retirement in 1994.

== Awards and decorations ==
- Southern Cross Decoration (SD)
- Southern Cross Medal (1975) (SM)
- Military Merit Medal (MMM)
- Pro Patria Medal (South Africa) (with Cunene Clasp) (Note: Only the Cunene clasp was awarded, to members who served in Angola during Operation Savannah in 1975 and 1976. Recipients of the clasp wear a button, with the letter C encircled by a wreath, on the ribbon bar.)
- General Service Medal (South Africa)
- Good Service Medal (Gold (30 Years))
- Good Service Medal (Silver (20 Years))
- Good Service Medal (Bronze (10 Years))
- Order of the Cloud and Banner (4^{th} Grade - with Special Cravat) (ORB)

Master Gunner #22
Master Gunner badge
Major; Christoffel Pierre 'Joffel' van der Westhuizen (Note: Post occupied when award was made: Chief Instructor Gunnery)
Year: 1971
← #15; Major; P.J.G. Booyse	#23 → Major; J.P. 'Jaap' du Rand

== Notes ==
Military offices
Preceded by Lt Gen Witkop Badenhorst	Chief of Staff Intelligence; 1991–1994	Succeeded by Lt Gen Dirk Verbeek
Preceded by Brig Gerrit Murphy	GOC Witwatersrand Command; 1987–1990	Succeeded by Maj Gen Wessel Kritzinger
Preceded by Brig Alex Potgieter	OC Eastern Province Command; 1983–1987	Succeeded by Brig Wessel Kritzinger
Preceded by Col Gert I. Potgieter	Director of Artillery; 1982–1982	Succeeded by Col Chris Venter
Honorary titles
Preceded by	Master Gunner; 1971	Succeeded by Maj Jaap du Rand
