= General Service Medal (Venda) =

- Type: Military campaign medal
- Awarded for: Service in defence of Venda or in the prevention or suppression of terrorism
- Country: Venda
- Presented by: the President
- Eligibility: All Ranks
- Status: Discontinued in 1994
- Established: 1985
- Ribbon bar

VDF pre-1994 & SANDF post-2002 orders of wear
- Next (higher): VDF precedence: Venda Defence Force Medal; SANDF precedence: Pro Patria Medal
- Next (lower): VDF succession: Independence Medal; SANDF succession: Southern Africa Medal

The General Service Medal was instituted by the President of the Republic of Venda in 1985, for award to all ranks for service in defence of Venda or in the prevention or suppression of terrorism.

== The Venda Defence Force ==
The 900 member Venda Defence Force (VDF) was established upon that country's independence on 13 September 1979. The Republic of Venda ceased to exist on 27 April 1994 and the Venda Defence Force was amalgamated with six other military forces into the South African National Defence Force (SANDF).

== Institution ==
The General Service Medal was instituted by the President of Venda in 1985. Venda's military decorations and medals were modelled on those of the Republic of South Africa and the General Service Medal is the approximate equivalent of the Pro Patria Medal.

== Award criteria ==
The medal could be awarded to all ranks for service in defence of Venda or in the prevention or suppression of terrorism.

== Order of wear ==
Since the General Service Medal was authorised for wear by one of the statutory forces which came to be part of the South African National Defence Force on 27 April 1994, it was accorded a position in the official South African order of precedence on that date.

Venda Defence Force until 26 April 1994

- Official VDF order of precedence:
  - Preceded by the Venda Defence Force Medal.
  - Succeeded by the Independence Medal.
- Venda official national order of precedence:
  - Preceded by the National Force Medal for Combating Terrorism.
  - Succeeded by the Police Medal for Combating Terrorism.

South African National Defence Force from 27 April 1994

- Official SANDF order of precedence:
  - Preceded by the Pro Patria Medal of the Republic of South Africa.
  - Succeeded by the Southern Africa Medal of the Republic of South Africa.
- Official national order of precedence:
  - Preceded by the Police Medal for Maintenance of Law and Order of the Republic of Ciskei.
  - Succeeded by the Police Medal for Combating Terrorism of the Republic of Venda.

The position of the General Service Medal in the official order of precedence was revised twice after 1994, to accommodate the inclusion or institution of new decorations and medals, first in April 1996 when decorations and medals were belatedly instituted for the two former non-statutory forces, the Azanian People's Liberation Army and Umkhonto we Sizwe, and again upon the institution of a new set of honours on 27 April 2003, but it remained unchanged on both occasions.

== Description ==
Obverse

The General Service Medal is a disk struck in bronze, 38 millimetres in diameter, depicting an elephant's head above two crossed battle-axes.

Reverse

The reverse displays the Coat of Arms of the Republic of Venda.

Ribbon

The ribbon is 32 millimetres wide, with a 2 millimetres wide yellow band, a 7 millimetres wide brown band and a 2 millimetres wide yellow band, repeated and separated by a 10 millimetres wide green band.

== Discontinuation ==
Conferment of the General Service Medal was discontinued when the Republic of Venda ceased to exist on 27 April 1994.
