= 10 Artillery Brigade (South Africa) =

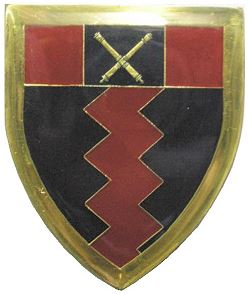
- 10 Artillery Brigade
- Active: 1983–1992
- Country: South Africa
- Allegiance: South Africa
- Branch: South African Army
- Type: Artillery Brigade
- Part of: South African Artillery Corps
- Garrison: Potchefstroom
- Nickname: 10 Art
- Equipment: G5 Howitzer; G2 Howitzer; 127mm Multiple Rocket Launcher; 120mm mortar
- Engagements: South African Border War

Commanders
- OC Operation Excite/Hilti: Commandant George Swanepoel

Insignia
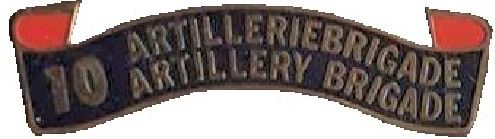
- SADF 10 Artillery Brigade laurel

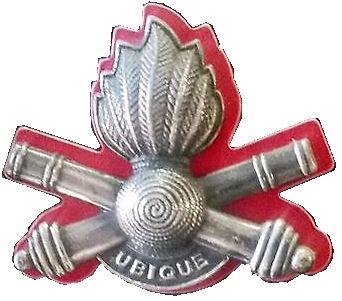
- 10 Artillery Brigade beret badge

10 Artillery Brigade was a South African Defence Force formation designed for mass artillery barrages, mainly for the 7 South African Infantry Division or 8 South African Armoured Division, as well as an ad hoc formation during Operation Prone, when needed and detached and reattached where required. Smaller components would then be used at the battlegroup level.

== History ==
10 Artillery Brigade was formed in Potchefstroom in 1983, when 4 Field Regiment and 14 Field Regiment were both incorporated as 4 Artillery Regiment and 14 Field Artillery Regiment. 4 Artillery Regiment was located to the old 14 Field Regiment base where the Brigade was established. It provided the base and training facilities as well as National Servicemen gunner training between each regiment on an annual basis.

=== Equipment ===
The Brigade utilized the following equipment:

- G5 155mm long range howitzer
- G6 155mm long range howitzer
- G2 140mm medium range howitzer
- Bateleur 127mm multiple rocket launcher
- M5 120 mm heavy mortars

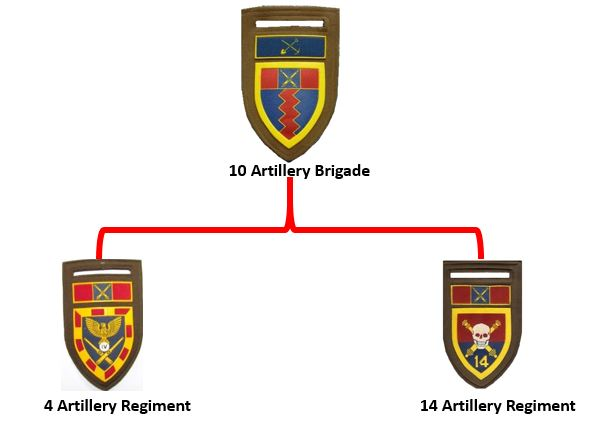
SADF 10 Artillery Brigade structure in Potchefstroom

=== South West Africa and Angola ===
==== Tactical headquarters ====
10 Artillery Brigade Tactical headquarters was an artillery formation created in 1988 to support the ad hoc formation of 10 SA Division which had been formed to counter the Cuban forces in south-western Angola in June 1988. It was composed of:

- a tactical headquarters,
- 14 Field Artillery Regiment comprising:
  - 14 Field Artillery Regiment HQ,
  - 155 mm G5 battery from 62 Mechanised Battalion Group,
  - a 140 mm G2 battery from Cape Field Artillery,
  - a 127 mm MRL battery from 32 Battalion,
  - a 120 mm mortar battery from 4 Artillery Regiment,
  - a meteorological section from 1 Locating Regiment,
  - a light workshop troop and
  - a signals troop
- 17 Field Regiment comprising:
  - 17 Field Regiment HQ,
  - a 155 mm G5 Battery from 61 Mechanised Battalion Group,
  - a 140 mm G2 Battery from 17 Field Regiment,
  - another 140 mm G2 Battery from Transvaal Horse Artillery,
  - a 127 mm MRL battery from 4 Artillery Regiment,
  - a meteorological section from 2 Locating Regiment,
  - a light workshop troop and
  - a signals troop
- 181 battery from 18 Light Regiment

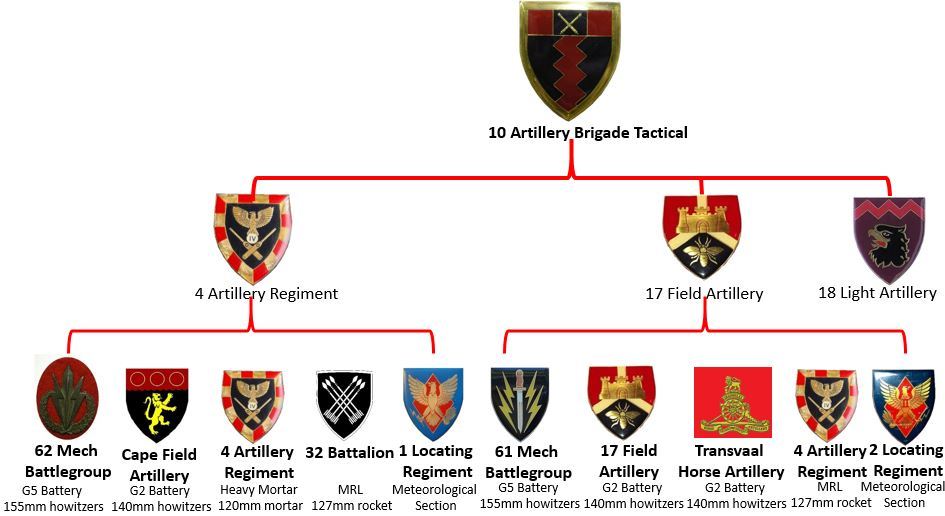
SADF 10 Artillery Brigade Tactical Structure Angola

==== Engagements ====
- Battles fought around Cuito Cuanavale
- Operation Excite/Hilti
- Operation Prone

=== Disbandment ===
10 Artillery Brigade became the basis for the South African Army Artillery Formation.

== Notes ==
- Velthuizen, Andreas (2009). "The significance of the battle for Cuito Cuanavale: Long term foresight of the current strategic landscape". Scientia Militaria: South African Journal of Military Studies. 37 (2). doi:10.5787/37-2-71. ISSN 2224-0020.
