= 1 Locating Regiment =

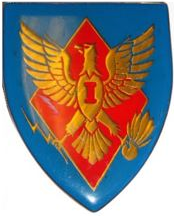
- 1 Locating Regiment emblem / Regiment Simonsberg
- Active: 1 March 1950
- Country: South Africa
- Allegiance: Republic of South Africa
- Branch: South African Army
- Type: Artillery
- Size: Regiment
- Part of: South African Army Artillery Corps
- Garrison/HQ: Stellenbosch
- Mottos: Pete et dele (Search and destroy)

1 Locating Regiment was an artillery locating regiment of the South African Artillery. The regiment provided divisional troops but was typically organized to allocate locating batteries to brigades.

== History ==
=== Origin ===
The unit can trace back its origins when it was created by the Faculty of Engineering of the University of Stellenbosch. Major C.L. Olen, a professor of engineering at this university was its first commander. Its headquarters was first seated in the engineer's faculty on the university grounds where it became a purely Afrikaans speaking unit.

=== Command affiliation ===
With the reorganization of the SA Army in August 1974, the unit, now a regiment was placed under the divisional commands of 7 South African Infantry Division and 8th Armoured Division (South Africa) at various stages.

=== Conversion in role and name ===
By 1990 the unit was converted with a new role as a 155mm RL medium artillery regiment. From this point the unit was also now named Regiment Simonsberg. The unit's headquarters was also moved to Jan Cilliers street in the town.

=== Specialization ===
The regiment provided divisional troops but was typically organized to allocate locating batteries to brigades. The regiment specialized in the technical search of enemy battery fire by means of delicate and sophisticated measuring equipment, such as radar and meteorology. A battery typically comprised an Intelligence Section, a Meteorological Section, and a Radar Troop of three radar sections each with a radar set, a Sound Ranging Troop, a Survey Troop and an Observation Troop.

During a border camp in 1976, members of the regiment measured the “cutline” and charted the installation in Owamboland.

== Commanding officers ==
- 1950 Major C.L. Olen
- 1990 Commandant I.P. Roux

== Freedom of entry ==
The regiment received freedom of entry into Stellenbosch on 18 October 1975 and received its colours on 4 March 1978.

== Insignia ==
The regiment's emblem was a blue background with a red diamond and a gold eagle holding a flash of lightning in its right claw and a grenade in its left claw. On its chest is a Roman letter I in red.

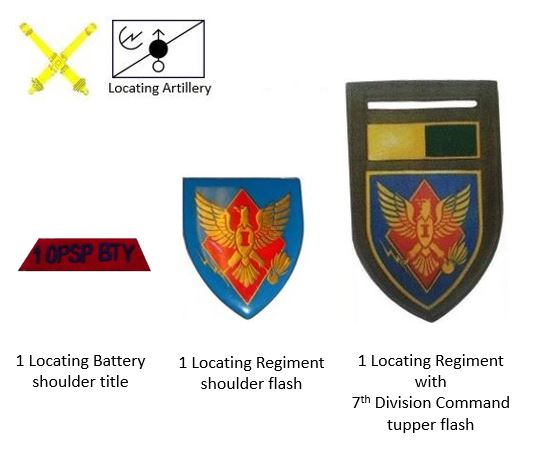
SADF era 1 Locating Regiment insignia
