= 2 Locating Regiment =

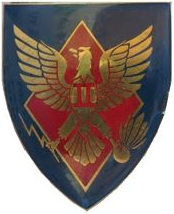
- 2 Locating Regiment emblem / Johannesburg Artillery Regiment
- Active: 1 March 1950
- Country: South Africa
- Allegiance: Republic of South Africa
- Branch: South African Army
- Type: Artillery
- Size: Regiment
- Part of: South African Army Artillery Corps
- Garrison/HQ: Auckland Park, Doornkop
- Mottos: Pete et dele (Search and destroy)

2 Locating Regiment was an artillery regiment of the South African Artillery. The regiment provided divisional troops but was typically organized to allocate locating batteries to brigades.

== History ==
=== Origin ===
This unit can trace its origins back to its creation at the University of Witwatersrand. Major H.B. Gilliland was its first commander. The unit struggled initially but by June 1951 a command nucleus could conduct its first training camp in Potchefstroom. By 1956 the unit had grown to such an extent that it could make personnel available to other units. By 1966 the unit moved from Auckland Park to Doornkop Military Base. Its last headquarters was however in Johannesburg.

=== Command affiliation ===
With the reorganization of the SA Army in August 1974, the unit, now a regiment was placed under the divisional command of 7 South African Infantry Division, but was also allocated to 8th Armoured Division (South Africa) later.

=== Renamed and amalgamated ===
The unit was renamed to the Johannesburg Artillery Regiment around 1990 but was finally amalgamated together with 7 Medium Artillery Regiment into the Transvaal Horse Artillery Regiment.

=== Specialization ===
The regiment consisted of 22 Battery. The regiment specialized in the technical search of enemy battery fire by means of delicate and sophisticated measuring equipment, such as radar and meteorology. The battery typically comprised an Intelligence Section, a Meteorological Section, and a Radar Troop of three radar section each with a radar set, a Sound Ranging Troop, a Survey Troop and an observation Troop. Three batteries of this unit conducted border service in the operational area in 1976.

=== Insignia ===
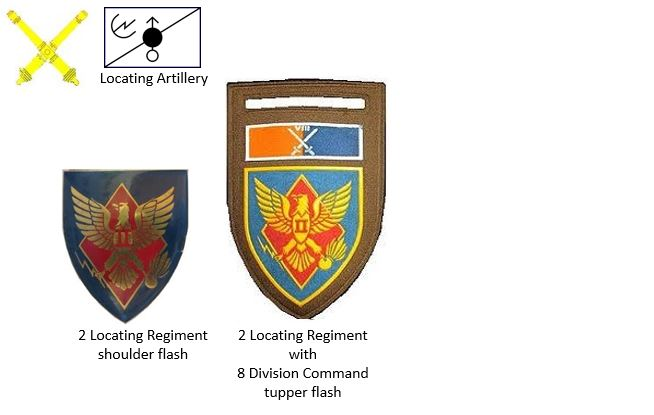
SADF era 2 Locating Regiment insignia

== Commanding officers ==
- 1950 Major H.B. Gilliland
- 1960 Major A.S. Brink
- 1967 - 79 Lt Col A Barry Nichol Pro Patria Medal, John Chard Medal, Chief of Defence force medal
- June 1979 Major Mike Smith

== Insignia ==
The regiment’s emblem is a blue background with a red diamond and a gold eagle holding a flash of lightning in its right claw and a grenade in its left claw. On its chest is a Roman letter II in red.
