= Southern Africa Medal =

- Type: Military campaign medal
- Awarded for: Service in military operations outside the borders of South Africa and South West Africa between 1976 and 1992
- Country: South Africa
- Presented by: the State President
- Eligibility: All Ranks
- Campaign: 1966-1989 Border War
- Status: Discontinued in 1994
- Established: 1987
- First award: 1991
- Ribbon bar

SADF pre-1994 & SANDF post-2002 orders of wear
- Next (higher): SADF precedence: Pro Patria Medal; SANDF precedence: General Service Medal
- Next (lower): SADF succession: General Service Medal; SANDF succession: General Service Medal

The Southern Africa Medal is a military campaign medal which was instituted by the Republic of South Africa in 1987. It was awarded to members of the South African Defence Force for service in military operations in Southern Africa, outside the borders of South Africa and South West Africa, between 1 April 1976 and 21 March 1990. It is reputed that the SADF took one of its captured T-55 tanks and melted it to use as a campaign medal.

== The South African military ==
The Union Defence Forces (UDF) were established in 1912 and renamed the South African Defence Force (SADF) in 1958. On 27 April 1994, it was integrated with six other independent forces into the South African National Defence Force (SANDF).

== The Southern Africa Medal ==
In August 1981, during Operation Protea, several Russian T34-85 tanks were shot out by the South African Defence Force at Xangongo in Angola. The Chief of the South African Defence Force at the time, General Constand Viljoen, expressed the wish that one of these tanks should be recovered and taken to Pretoria, with the intention to use it as material to strike medals from. His idea was based on the origin of the British Victoria Cross, which was struck from the copper cascabels of a cannon from the Crimean War. The tank is still on display at the Fort Klapperkop Museum in Pretoria, while the resulting medal was the Southern Africa Medal.

Unlike a copper cannon cascabel, however, the armour steel of a battle tank is too hard to be struck into medals, using hardened steel tooling. The tank itself was therefore not suitable to use to strike medals from. However, since the medal was to be struck in nickel-silver, an alloy of nickel, copper and zinc, several kilograms of copper was recovered from burnt cables in the Xangongo tank, melted, mixed in with molten nickel-silver and then used to manufacture a limited number of the Southern Africa Medal, including the specimen medal depicted.

The tank was recovered by 10 Armoured Car Squadron on 9 August 1982, as part of a deception strategy for Operation Meebos

== Institution ==
The Southern Africa Medal was instituted by the State President in 1987.

== Award criteria ==
The medal was awarded to serving members of all ranks of the South African Defence Force for participation in military operations in Southern Africa, outside the borders of South Africa and South West Africa, between 1 April 1976 and 21 March 1990. Since members who qualified for the medal would also qualify for the award of the Pro Patria Medal, such members were awarded both these campaign medals.

Service in Angola during Operation Savannah in 1975 and before 1 April 1976 was excluded, since members who took part in that operation were awarded the Cunene Clasp to the Pro Patria Medal.

== Order of wear ==
The position of the Southern Africa Medal in the order of precedence was revised three times after 1987, to accommodate the inclusion or institution of new decorations and medals, first upon the integration into the South African National Defence Force in 1994, again in April 1996, when decorations and medals were belatedly instituted for the two former non-statutory forces, the Azanian People's Liberation Army and Umkhonto we Sizwe, and finally upon the institution of a new set of honours on 27 April 2003, but it remained unchanged on the latter two occasions.

South African Defence Force until 26 April 1994

- Official SADF order of precedence:
  - Preceded by the Pro Patria Medal.
  - Succeeded by the General Service Medal.
- Official national order of precedence:
  - Preceded by the Railways Police Medal for Combating Terrorism.
  - Succeeded by the General Service Medal.

South African National Defence Force from 27 April 1994

- Official SANDF order of precedence:
  - Preceded by the General Service Medal of the Republic of Venda.
  - Succeeded by the General Service Medal of the Republic of South Africa.
- Official national order of precedence:
  - Preceded by the Police Medal for Combating Terrorism of the Republic of Transkei.
  - Succeeded by the General Service Medal of the Republic of South Africa.

== Description ==
Obverse

The Southern Africa Medal is an octagonal medallion struck in nickel silver, 3 millimetres thick, to fit in a circle 38 millimetres in diameter. It depicts a cheetah walking past a thorn tree. As a matter of interest, the cheetah depicted on the medal was copied by the medal designer, State Herald Fred Brownell, from the definitive issue 10c postage stamp which was issued in South West Africa on 1 October 1980.

Reverse

The reverse has the words "SUIDER-AFRIKA" and "SOUTHERN AFRICA" in two lines, underneath the pre-1994 South African Coat of Arms, surrounded by a wreath of leaves, with the medal number stamped underneath.

Ribbon

The ribbon is 32 millimetres wide, with red, yellow and black bands, all 5 millimetres wide and repeated in reverse order, separated by a 2 millimetres wide white band in the centre. The red, yellow and black ribbon colours are those of the National Flag of Angola, where the majority of these cross border operations took place during the 1966-1989 Border War.

Versions

The first 20,000 medals had a rough frosted-like surface, while the later version had a more traditional and more attractive smooth surface. The batch of medals which contains copper from the Xangongo tank, such as the specimen medal depicted, are from the later batch of 40,000 medals.

== Mentioned in dispatches ==
A recipient of the Southern Africa Medal who was mentioned in dispatches during the campaign outside the borders of South Africa and South West Africa between 1 April 1976 and 21 March 1990, is entitled to wear a miniature Coat of Arms on the medal ribbon.

== Discontinuation ==
Conferment of the medal was discontinued in respect of services performed on or after 27 April 2003.
