= 14 Field Artillery Regiment =

14 Artillery Regiment
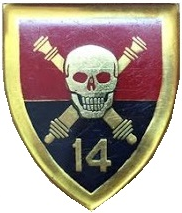
- 14 Artillery Regiment emblem
- Active: 1962, reformed 1974 to 1990?
- Country: South Africa
- Allegiance: Republic of South Africa
- Branch: South African Army
- Type: Regular artillery
- Role: Field Artillery
- Size: Regiment
- Part of: South African Army Artillery Corps; Army Conventional
- Garrison/HQ: Bethlehem, Potchefstroom
- Patron: St Barbara
- Mottos: Viso Et Vinco (Seek and Destroy)
- Engagements: World War II; South African Border War
- Battle honours: South-West Africa
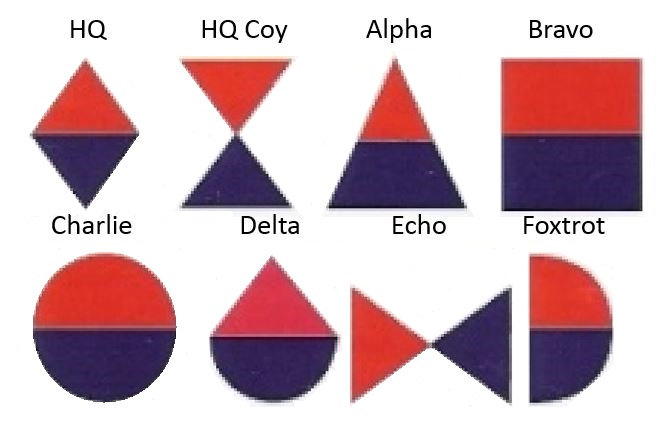
- Artillery Battery Emblems

- Artillery Beret Bar circa 1992

14 Artillery Regiment was a South African Artillery unit whose name was used twice. It was re-established in Potchefstroom in 1974 and was a full-time unit responsible for the training of Permanent Force and National Service personnel.

== History ==
=== The original 14 Field Regiment ===
14 Field Regiment was initially formed in Bethlehem in the Orange Free State in 1962 with only one Battery, namely 143 Battery with an intake from Commando Regiments for their basic and individual training on the G1 and G2 guns with additional basic training on smaller weapons such as the 60 and 81mm mortars as well as .50-calibre machine guns. During October 1967, 14 Field Regiment was relocated to Potchefstroom where it was disbanded on 7 November 1967 and its structures incorporated into 4 Artillery Regiment. Its operational Battery at Walvis Bay was renamed 43 Battery Walvis Bay.

=== Rebirth of 14 Field Regiment ===
On 13 May 1974 the unit was however reactivated and renamed to 14 Field Artillery Regiment and located outside Potchefstroom in September 1974.

=== New requirements ===
The SADF was interested in the 120 mm mortar system and the activation of an airborne artillery battery. There was also an emphasis on obtaining 155 mm guns. Gunners from 14 Field Artillery were therefore sent to Israel for training on the Israeli Defense Forces Soltam 120 mm Mortar.

=== Structure ===
14 Artillery Regiment comprised the following:

- A Regimental Headquarters,
- 141 Battery, Airborne Battery
- FOU (Forward Observation units), Attached to 141 Battery
- 142 Battery,
- 143 Battery,
- 2 Medium Battery,
- 144 Battery
- 32 Locating Battery.

=== Operations ===
14 Artillery Regiment took part in Operation Savannah and provided the first troop of 25-pounders. It was involved in the Battle of Quifangondo. 14 Artillery Regiment was organized under 10 Artillery Brigade from 1983 forward for the final operations.

=== Dress Insignia ===
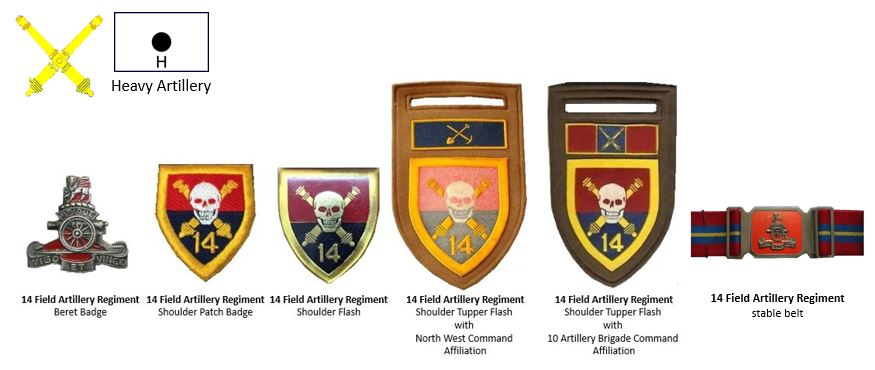
SADF era 14 Field Artillery Regiment insignia
