= 4 Artillery Regiment (South Africa) =

South African Army unit

4 Field Artillery
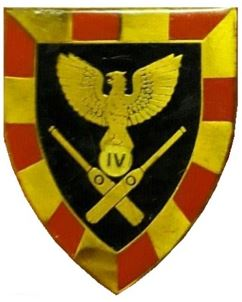
- SANDF 4 Artillery Regiment emblem
- Active: 1945 to present
- Country: South Africa
- Allegiance: Republic of South Africa; Republic of South Africa
- Branch: South African Army; South African Army
- Type: Regular artillery
- Role: Medium (self propelled) Artillery (G6)
- Size: Regiment
- Part of: South African Army Artillery Formation; Army Conventional
- Garrison/HQ: Potchefstroom, Northwest Province
- Patron: St Barbara
- Motto: Always in support
- Colors: The launchers
- Anniversaries: 29 June
- Equipment: GV6 155 mm self-propelled howitzer
- Engagements: World War II; South African Border War
- Battle honours: South West Africa

Insignia
- Collar Badge: Bursting grenade with seven flames
- Beret Colour: Oxford Blue
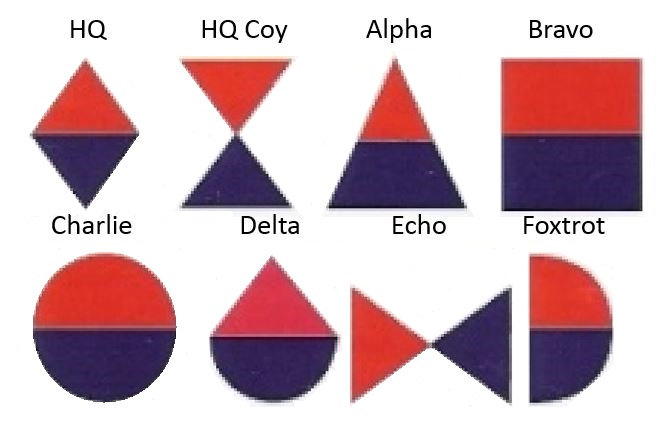
- Artillery Battery Emblems

- Artillery Beret Bar circa 1992

4 Artillery Regiment is based at Potchefstroom, responsible for the training of soldiers allotted to Field and Medium Artillery.

== History ==
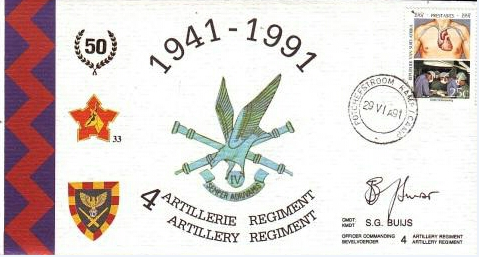
SADF era 4 Artillery Commemorative Cover 1991

=== Origins ===
==== Under the UDF ====
On 28 May 1945, authority was granted for the formation of 4 Field Artillery as a full-time regiment with effect 1 April 1945.

===== Successor to 4 Field Brigade =====
4 Artillery was the successor to 4 Field Brigade, which had made a name for itself at Combolcia, Dessie and Amba Alagi in Ethiopia. The regiment served at El Alamein under its own name – as part of 1 SA Division – and in Italy as part of 6 SA Armoured Division, notably at Monte Stanco.

In May 1946 the unit became part of the Permanent Force's 11 Armoured Brigade. When the latter was disbanded in 1951, the unit continued on as 10 Field Battery.

===== 4 Field Training Regiment =====
Based in Potchefstroom, it became 4 Field Training Regiment in 1953 with 10, 11 and 12 Field Batteries at Potchefstroom, Bloemfontein and Oudtshoorn respectively. It was disestablished as a training institution in November 1967. It continued as 4 Field Regiment from 1967 to 1975 with 1 Medium, 41 and 42 batteries based at Potchefstroom and 43 battery in Walvis Bay. 1 Medium battery used the BL5.5-inch medium howitzer (eighty pounder) whereas 41, 42 and 43 batteries used the Ordnance QF 25-pounder.

==== Under the SADF ====
===== Border War =====
The regiment reactivated in 1975 and took part in most operations since Operation Savannah in 1976. It was back in action in August and September 1981 in support of Operation Protea with 41 Bty (120 mm mortar) and 43 Bty (120 mm mortar) and Operation Daisy with 43 Bty (120 mm mortar) in support of 61 Mechanised Battalion Group. In 1983 the regiment became part of 10 Artillery Brigade (with 14 Artillery Regiment) and was renamed 4 Artillery Regiment the next year. By 1987 4 Artillery was structured as:

- 41 Battery
- 42 Battery
- 43 Battery and
- 1 Medium Battery

In 1987 the regiment took part in Operation Moduler and in 1988 in Operation Hooper, Operation Displace and Operation Prone. In 1989, the regiment was part of the Merlyn Brigade based at Grootfontein, returning home after Namibian independence. The Artillery Brigade and 14 Artillery Regiment disbanded on 1 January 1993.

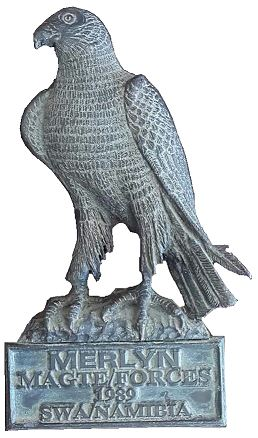
4 Artillery was part of the Sector 10 response to the Cuban buildup and SWAPO incursions, known as the Merlyn Forces in 1989 South West Africa

=== Internal operations ===
In 1985 and 1986 the unit had tours as provisional infantry in Soweto, Tembisa, Alexandra and in the KwaNdebele homeland.

==== Under the SANDF ====
===== Organisation =====
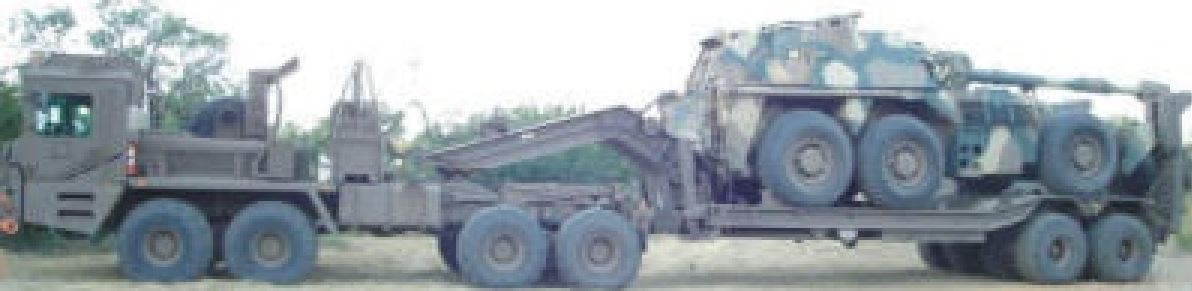
Cavallo transporter with a G6 self-propelled gun

The regiment is currently organised as a composite unit and has a growth capability for the establishment of additional regiments if required: In the draft South African Army Vision 2020 force design, the 2007 organograms published with Leon Engelbrecht's unpublished manuscript A Guide to the SANDF chart 4 Artillery Regiment as the medium self-propelled artillery regiment of the Armoured Brigade (Free State) within the Mechanised Division (headquarters Wallmansthal).

- 4 Regimental Support Battery (4 RSB)
- 41 (Papa) Battery Soltam M-65 120 mm mortar
- 42 (Quebec) Battery G6 155mm Gun/Howitzer
- 43 (Romeo) Battery Bateleur FV2 127mm multiple rocket launcher
- 44 (Sierra) Battery G5 155mm Gun/Howitzer
- 45 Battery Target Acquisition Bty

== Regimental Colours ==
In March 1973 the unit broke with artillery tradition, which recognises the unit's guns as its colours, and took possession of a regimental colour, becoming the first artillery regiment to be presented with a regimental colour and claims to be the first to have appointed an honorary colonel.

== Insignia ==
=== Master Gunners ===
At least six people serving with 4 Artillery have had the prestigious award conferred on them of Master.Gunner. This includes three commanding officers, two second-in-commands and at least one Battery Sgt Major.

Master Gunner Badge (Qualification and Decoration)
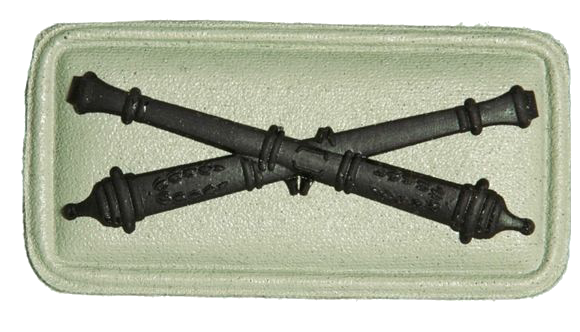
Black on Thatch beige, Embossed. Crossed gun barrels

=== Previous Dress Insignia ===
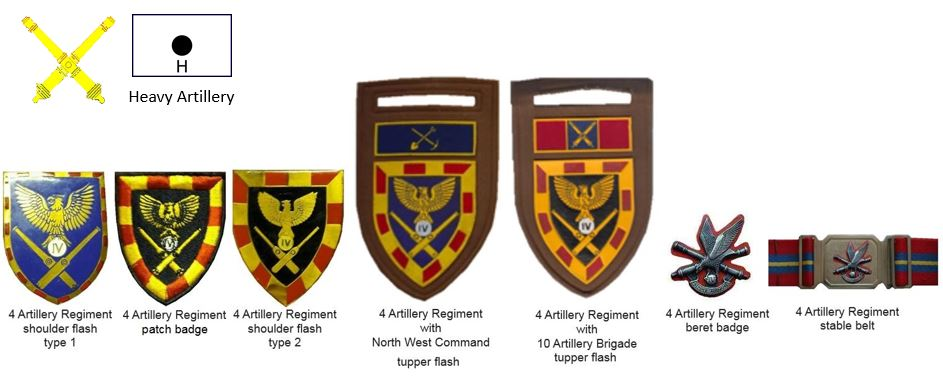
SADF era 4 Artillery Regiment insignia

== Leadership ==
4 Artillery Regiment Leadership
From	Honorary Colonels	To	Ribbon
1984	Col (Hon) Johann Oosthuizen	2012	
From	Officers Commanding 4 Field Regiment	To	Ribbon
1946	Lt Col Nick Bierman SSA,SM,CBE (Note: Later Lieutenant General) (Note: Later Army Chief of Staff)	1947	Star of South Africa SSA Southern Cross Medal SM Order of the British Empire CBE
1950	Lt Col Bob Meintjies DSO (Note: Later Major General) (Note: Master Gunner)	1953	Distinguished Service Order DSO
nd	Lt Col Ronald McWilliam	1962	
1962	Lt Col Hendrik Greyvenstein SM (Note: Later Brigadier)	1963	Southern Cross Medal SM
1963	Lt Col Jack Hawtayne	1968	
1968	Lt Col Richard Frederick "Shorty" Brown SM,MMM	1969	Southern Cross Medal SM Military Merit Medal MMM
1969	Lt Col Piet van der Walt	nd	
From	Officers Commanding 4 Artillery Regiment	To	Ribbon
1991	Cmdt Sarel Buijs	1993	
1993	Lt Col Chris Roux SM,MMM (Note: Later Brigadier General)	1994	Southern Cross Medal SM Military Merit Medal MMM
1994	Col Deon Holtzhausen SM,MMM	1997	Southern Cross Medal SM Military Merit Medal MMM
1997	Lt Col Phillip van Dyk	nd	
nd	Lt Col Sarel Kruger	nd	
2004	Lt Col Thulani Zungu	4004	
2004	Lt Col André J. Claassen	2006	
2006	Lt Col Victor Khasapane	2010	
nd	Lt Col Matloki Misapitso	2014	
2014	Lt Col Jongile Maso (Note: LaterBrigadierGeneral; Later Commander of the DOD Mobilisation Centre)	2016	
2017	Lt Col Mimy Matimbe	2020	
2020	Lt Col Joe Tshabalala	nd	
From	Regimental Sergeants Major	To	Ribbon
	No known incumbents		

== Freedom of the City ==
The regiment was awarded the Freedom of Potchefstroom in 1984.
