= Pro Patria Medal (South Africa) =

- Type: Military campaign medal
- Awarded for: 55 days continuous or 90 days non-continuous duty in an operational area, or involvement in combat, a skirmish, or an incident caused by enemy activities
- Country: South Africa
- Presented by: the State President
- Eligibility: All Ranks
- Campaign: 1966 – 1992 Border War
- Clasps: Cunene Clasp for service in Angola in 1975 – 1976
- Status: Discontinued in 2003
- Established: 1974
- First award: 1978
- Ribbon bar without and with Cunene button

SADF pre-1994 & SANDF post-2002 orders of wear
- Next (higher): SADF precedence: Korea Medal; SANDF precedence: Korea Medal
- Next (lower): SADF succession: Southern Africa Medal; SANDF succession: General Service Medal

The Pro Patria Medal is a South African military campaign medal which was instituted by the Republic in 1974. It was awarded to members of the South African Defence Force for service in a designated operational area, for participation in a Minister-acknowledged operation, or for involvement in combat, a skirmish, or an incident caused by enemy activities.

== The South African military ==
The Union Defence Forces (UDF) were established in 1912 and renamed the South African Defence Force (SADF) in 1958. On 27 April 1994, it was integrated with six other independent forces into the South African National Defence Force (SANDF).

== Institution ==
The Pro Patria Medal was instituted by the State President in 1974. That original medal, awarded "in recognition of service rendered in connection with the prevention or combating of terrorism", was repealed by a warrant of the State President dated 8 June 1976 (Government Gazette No. 5171 of 25 June 1976), which instituted a replacement medal of the same name to recognise service more broadly, "in the defence of the Republic or for the prevention or suppression of terrorism"; the design, rules and criteria described elsewhere in this article date from that 1976 warrant, as amended in 1977.

== Original 1974 medal ==
The medal instituted in 1974 differed substantially from the medal described elsewhere in this article. Its warrant stated that the medal was awarded in recognition of service rendered in connection with the prevention or combating of terrorism, and its Rule 5 provided that it "shall be awarded only to a person who as a member of the South African Defence Force or who in support of the South African Defence Force performed services relating to the prevention or combating of terrorism for at least six months, which period may be cumulative, in an area determined by the Chief of the South African Defence Force and who behaved in an exemplary manner." There was no provision for award on the basis of combat, a skirmish, or participation in a specific operation.

Under the 1974 Rule 2, a clasp was awarded for each successive six-month qualifying period after the first: struck in bronze for the second, third and fourth such periods, and in silver thereafter, with the award of a silver clasp superseding any bronze clasps already held. This differs from the clasp system described below, under which the only clasp awarded (the Cunene Clasp) recognised participation in a specific operation rather than additional periods of qualifying service. The design of the medal — a bronze octagon with a blue-and-gold obverse and the embellished Coat of Arms on the reverse — was unchanged between the 1974 and 1976 warrants.

The 1974 warrant and its Rules and Regulations were repealed and replaced by the 1976 warrant described below.

== Award criteria ==
The medal could be awarded to serving members of all ranks of the South African Defence Force. The conditions for award, as amended in 1977, stipulated that the recipient had to have:

- been involved in combat or a skirmish or combat situation or an incident caused by enemy activities, or
- participated in a specific operation acknowledged by the Minister of Defence, or
- served for a continuous period of 55 days or non-continuous for 90 days in an operational area as designated by the Minister of Defence.

The original 1976 warrant had required a continuous period of at least 60 days, and had confined the combat criterion to a "combat situation ... with the enemy"; both requirements were relaxed by the 1977 amendment.

The wording on the certificate of award reads "The Pro Patria Medal was awarded for service in the defence of the Republic or for the prevention or suppression of terrorism".

== Order of wear ==
The position of the Pro Patria Medal in the official order of precedence was revised three times after 1975, to accommodate the inclusion or institution of new decorations and medals.

South African Defence Force until 26 April 1994

- Official SADF order of precedence:
  - Preceded by the Korea Medal.
  - Succeeded by the Southern Africa Medal.
- Official national order of precedence:
  - Preceded by the South African Police Medal for Combating Terrorism.
  - Succeeded by the South African Railways Police Medal for Combating Terrorism.

South African National Defence Force from 27 April 1994

- Official SANDF order of precedence:
  - Preceded by the Korea Medal of the Union of South Africa.
  - Succeeded by the General Service Medal of the Republic of Venda.
- Official national order of precedence:
  - Preceded by the South African Police Medal for Combating Terrorism of the Republic of South Africa.
  - Succeeded by the Bophuthatswana Police Medal for Combating Terrorism of the Republic of Bophuthatswana.

The position of the Pro Patria Medal in the order of precedence remained unchanged, as it was on 27 April 1994, when decorations and medals were belatedly instituted in April 1996 for the two former non-statutory forces, the Azanian People's Liberation Army and Umkhonto we Sizwe, and again when a new series of military decorations and medals was instituted in South Africa on 27 April 2003.

== Description ==
=== Obverse ===
The Pro Patria Medal is an octagonal medallion, struck in bronze and gilded, to fit in a circle 38 mm (1.5 in) in diameter and 3 mm (0.12 in) thick at the centre, with a golden aloe emblem in the centre on a blue roundel, 22 mm (0.87 in) in diameter.

=== Reverse ===
The pre-1994 South African Coat of Arms is on the reverse, with the medal number stamped underneath.

Later version with fixed suspender

=== Ribbon ===
The ribbon is 32 mm (1.3 in) wide, with a 3 mm (0.12 in) wide orange band, a 1.5 mm (0.059 in) wide white band, a 5 mm (0.20 in) wide orange band and a 6 mm (0.24 in) wide dark blue band, repeated in reverse order and separated by a 1 mm (0.039 in) wide orange band in the centre.

=== Versions ===
The early medals and ribbon suspenders were minted separately and attached to each other with rings which enabled the medal to swing. On the original medal, the roundel on the obverse was also minted separately. The earliest version of the medal was minted by the South African Mint, but from c. 1980, further production of the medal was put out to tender by private enterprises. As a result, several versions appeared, nearly all minted with the ribbon suspender as an integral part of the medal and some still with a separately minted roundel, some without the gilding, and some minted with both the ribbon suspender and the roundel as an integral part of the medal.

== Mentioned in dispatches ==
Mentioned in Dispatches

A recipient of the Pro Patria Medal who was mentioned in dispatches during the 1966-1989 Border War, was entitled to wear a miniature Coat of Arms on the medal ribbon and ribbon bar.

== Clasps and Bars ==
=== Clasps ===
Only the Cunene clasp was awarded, to members who served in Angola during Operation Savannah in 1975 and 1976. Recipients of the clasp wear a button, with the letter C encircled by a wreath, on the ribbon bar.

=== Bars ===
Although the 1974 warrant made provision for bars, none were authorised.

== Discontinuation ==
Conferment of the Pro Patria Medal was discontinued in respect of services performed on or after 27 April 2003.

== Government Warrants ==
- "WARRANT BY THE STATE PRESIDENT OF THE REPUBLIC OF SOUTH AFRICA CONCERNING THE INSTITUTION OF THE "PRO PATRIA MEDAL"". Republic of South Africa Government Gazette. 113 (4490). Pretoria: 1–4. 8 November 1974.
- "DEPARTMENT OF DEFENCE: WARRANT: BY THE STATE PRESIDENT OF THE REPUBLIC OF SOUTH AFRICA CONCERNING THE INSTITUTION OF THE "PRO PATRIA MEDAL.—PRO PATRIA-MEDALJE"". Republic of South Africa Government Gazette. 132 (5171). Pretoria: 30–33. 25 June 1976.
- "WARRANT BY THE STATE PRESIDENT OF THE REPUBLIC OF SOUTH AFRICA CONCERNING THE AMENDMENT OF THE WARRANT INSTITUTING THE "PRO PATRIA MEDAL"". Republic of South Africa Government Gazette. 144 (5575). Pretoria: 1. 3 June 1977.
- "Consolidated Official Table of Precedence: Orders, Decorations and Medals". Republic of South Africa Government Gazette. 477 (27376). Pretoria: 3–22. 11 March 2005.
- "PRESIDENTIAL WARRANTS - CORRECTION NOTICE". Republic of South Africa Government Gazette. 471 (26778). Pretoria: 6–7. 17 September 2004. "Government Gazette No. 25213 of 25 July 2003, is hereby corrected as follows:"
- "WARRANT BY THE STATE PRESIDENT OF THE REPUBLIC OF SOUTH AFRICA CONCERNING THE AMENDMENT OF THE WARRANT INSTITUTING THE "PRO PATRIA MEDAL"". Republic of South Africa Government Gazette. 126 (4932). Pretoria: 1. 19 December 1975.
