= List of badges of the South African Army =

South African Army qualification, proficiency, and rank insignia

Flag of the South African Army

The South African National Defence Force, like most around the world, has various insignia. The army badges authorised for wear are listed here. If members from other arms of service qualify for these badges, they are also permitted to wear them, The criteria are, in most cases, current but there is some historical information included. (Note: NSN-18–187–0476) (Note: Publication Number - ICC 702/2)

This page provides an extensive list of various badges used by the South African Army to distinguish and identify different military units, branches, and ranks. It includes descriptions and images of badges such as shoulder titles, formation patches, trade badges, qualification badges, and others. Some of the badges listed have historical significance, such as those used during the apartheid era, while others are currently in use. It also includes information on the history and evolution of badges in the South African Army.

== Background ==
New badges have been created to be worn on the camouflage combat dress. These badges are made of black, embossed plastic and are set against a thatch green background. According to dress regulations, only Parachute Qualification Badges may be worn on the left breast, above the pocket. On the right breast, members are expected to wear their name tag, followed by a maximum of two other badges.

== Insignia ==
=== Good Conduct Stripes ===
These are worn on the right (pocket), below the name badge on Dress No 1 – 4. There are three Levels - Awarded for good conduct. The criteria for the awarding of this badge are unknown at this stage. (Note: Please note that in spite of extensive research, no criteria for the award of these badges can be found)

Good Conduct
Garment with Pocket: Centred on the right pocket
Garment without Pocket: 10 millimetres (0.39 in) below the name badge
Insignia
Level	Embossed	Service Dress	NCG	Army Band
I	Good Conduct (Award) Level I. Black on Thatch beige, Embossed. Single Black Horizontal stripe	Good Conduct (Award) Level I, Service Dress. Olive Green with Gold Stripe. Single Gold Horizontal stripe	Good Conduct	Good Conduct
II	Good Conduct (Award) Level II. Black on Thatch beige, Embossed. Two parallel Black Horizontal stripes	Good Conduct (Award) Level II, Service Dress. Olive Green with Gold Stripes. Two parallel Gold Horizontal stripes	No Image	Good Conduct
III	Good Conduct (Award) Level III. Black on Thatch beige, Embossed. Three parallel Black Horizontal stripes	Good Conduct (Award) Level III, Service Dress. Olive Green with Gold Stripes. Three parallel Gold Horizontal stripes	Good Conduct	Good Conduct

=== Badge for Voluntary Reserve Force Service (BVRS) ===
BVRS
Awarding Authority:	SANDF Director Ceremonial and Music	
Description
Dress No 1 – 3 and 5C:	Identification, BVRS, Chrome and Enamel (SANDF Emblem surrounded by a laurel wreath)	Badge for Voluntary Reserve Force Service
Dress No 5A:	Identification, BVRS, Chrome and Enamel, Miniature (SANDF Emblem surrounded by a laurel wreath)	Badge for Voluntary Reserve Force Service
Dress No 4:	Identification, BVRS, Black on Thatch beige (SANDF Emblem surrounded by a laurel wreath)	Badge for Voluntary Reserve Force Service (Service Award) Five Years Voluntary Service. Black on Thatch beige, Embossed.
Criteria:	The identification is only awarded to members of the Part Time Forces who have completed 5 years exemplary voluntary service (ie over and above any compulsory service). Unit commanders must submit a reasoned recommendation (which covers the member’s actual active participation in the unit’s activities) via the Command/Formation HQ to Director Ceremonial and Music for approval.	
Note:	Members who subsequently join the Permanent Force, or serve full time, are not permitted to wear the identification	

THE CHIEF OF THE SOUTH AFRICAN NATIONAL DEFENCE FORCE’S BADGE FOR VOLUNTARY RESERVE FORCE SERVICE (BVRS)

The Badge for voluntary service is awarded to Officers, Warrant Officers, Non-Commissioned Officers and Other Ranks of the Reserve Force of the South African National Defence Force who complete a period of five years of exemplary voluntary service in the Reserve Force of the South African National Defence Force.

The Badge is awarded by the Chief of the SANDF on the recommendation of the Chief of the Services, to whom the awarding powers of the C SANDF may be delegated.

The design of the Badge is that of the Badge of the South African National Defence Force in enamel, encircled by a gilt protea wreath, the whole 30 mm in height by 25 mm in width. A cloth emblem is also issued to a recipient in to be worn in accordance with the prescribed dress regulations.

As a National Defence Force distinction for exemplary voluntary Reserve Force service, the Badge takes precedence over and is worn above badges for proficiency, qualification, trades or identity.

Divisional, Formation and Unit commanders recommend to the next higher headquarters on the prescribed form, the award of the Badge in respect of each qualifying member of the Reserve Force.

The Badge may also be awarded for service in honorary appointments.

The institution, wearing, conditions, restrictions and procedures for the award is prescribed in CSANDF Instruction No 05/04 under reference

HR SUP CEN/AWARDS/R/104/13/2/8/1/P dated 17 August 2004.

=== 61 Mechanised Battalion Operational Service Badge ===
The unit awarded a small badge called the Operational Badge for those in or attached to the unit who deployed with the unit on operational duties. The initial version of this had a yellow backing and was awarded only for cross border operations into Angola. A subsequent version with a green backing was mooted, which was intended to be for internal duties. This green backed badge was never approved and the Yellow backed badge continued to be awarded for all operations in which 61 Mech was involved, including internal ones. The badge consists of a dagger with three diagonal lightning bolts in red across it. A subdued version was produced for wear on nutria (brown's) uniforms. With the introduction of camouflage, a new version was produced on green thatching.

Operational Service Badge
Awarding Authority:	Awarding of this badge has been suspended	
Description
Dress No 1 – 3 and 5C	Identification, 61 Mechanised, Chrome and Enamel (Rectangular bar (upright) in yellow with a black dagger embellished in silver and three red lightning flashes angled diagonally across the blade (10 mm (0.39 in) wide, 40 mm (1.6 in) long))	61 Mech Operational Service Badge (Service) Service Dress. Rectangular bar (upright) in yellow with a black dagger embellished in silver and three red lightning flashes angled diagonally across the blade
Dress No 5A	Identification, 61 Mechanised, Chrome and Enamel, Miniature (Rectangular bar (upright) in yellow with a black dagger embellished in silver and three red lightning flashes angled diagonally across the blade (10 mm wide, 40 mm long))	61 Mech Operational Service Badge (Service) Service Dress. Rectangular bar (upright) in yellow with a black dagger embellished in silver and three red lightning flashes angled diagonally across the blade
Dress No 4	Identification, 61 Mechanised, Black on Thatch beige (Rectangular bar (upright) with a black dagger and three black lightning flashes angled diagonally across the blade)	61 Mech Operational Service Badge (Service) Black on Thatch beige, Embossed. Rectangular bar (upright) with a black dagger and three black lightning flashes angled diagonally across the blade
Nutria (Note: Old style "Browns")	Black printed on brown tape	61 Mech Operational Service Badge (Service) Nutria.
	This badge's knife points towards the heart of wearer	
Criteria	1. Served in the unit for a specified period 2. Participated in an operation or helped to ensure success in an operation in which the unit participated 3. No criminal record	

=== Air Supply ===
==== Qualification: Air Supply ====
Air Supply
Awarding Authority:	The Officer Commanding DOD Air Supply Unit	
Description
Dress No 1 – 3 and 5C	Qualification, Air-Supplier, Chrome and enamel (Half wing with parachute on blue background)	Air Supply (Qualification) Half Wing. Chrome and enamel. Half wing with parachute on blue background
Dress No 5A	Qualification, Air-Supplier, Chrome and enamel, Miniature (Half wing with parachute on blue background)	Air Supply
Dress No 4	Qualification, Air-Supplier, Black on Thatch beige (Half wing)	Air Supply (Qualification) Half Wing. Black on Thatch beige, Embossed. Half wing
Criteria	Successful completion of Course OSC Mod 52 Basic Air Supply	

==== Qualification: Air Supply Instructor ====
Air Supply
Awarding Authority:	The Officer Commanding DOD Air Supply Unit	
Description
Dress No 1 – 3 and 5C	Qualification, Air-Supply Instructor, Chrome and enamel (Complete wing with parachute on red background)	Air Supply Instructor (Qualification) Full Wing. Chrome and enamel. Complete wing with parachute on red background
Dress No 5A	Qualification, Air-Supply Instructor, Chrome and enamel, Miniature (Complete wing with parachute on red background)	Air Supply Instructor
Dress No 4	Qualification, Air-Supply Instructor, Black on Thatch beige (Complete wing)	Air Supply Instructor (Qualification) Full Wing. Black on Thatch beige, Embossed. Full Wing
Criteria	Successful completion of Course OSC Mod 52 Basic Air Supply	

=== Gunner ===
==== Identification: General of the Gunners ====
General of the Gunners
Awarding Authority:	GOC (Note: General Officer Commanding) SA Army Artillery Formation	
Description
Dress No 1 – 3 and 5C	Identification General of the Gunners, Chrome (Crossed gun barrels with grenade)	General of the Gunners (Post) Chrome. Crossed gun barrels with grenade
Dress No 5A	Identification General of the Gunners, Miniature, Chrome (Crossed gun barrels with grenade)	General of the Gunners
Dress No 4	Identification General of the Gunners, Black on Thatch beige (Crossed gun barrels with grenade)	General of the Gunners (Post) Black on Thatch beige, Embossed. Crossed gun barrels with grenade
Criteria	An SAA or ADA officer nominated by GOC SA Army Arty Fmn and the outgoing General of the Gunners and approved by the Chief of the Army	

==== Proficiency: Master Gunner ====
Master Gunner
Awarding Authority:	GOC SA Army Artillery Formation	
Description
Dress No 1 – 3 and 5C	Proficiency SA Army Master Gunner, Artillery, Chrome (Crossed gun barrels)	Master Gunner Badge (Qualification and Decoration) Chrome. Crossed gun barrels
Dress No 5A	Proficiency SA Army Master Gunner, Artillery, Miniature, Chrome (Crossed gun barrels)	Master Gunner Badge
Dress No 4	Proficiency SA Army Master Gunner, Artillery, Black on Thatch beige (Crossed gun barrels)	Master Gunner Badge (Qualification and Decoration) Black on Thatch beige, Embossed. Crossed gun barrels
Criteria	1. A serving member of the SAA at the time of the award 2. An RSA citizen of at least seven years standing 3. Successfully completed a long gunnery course OR qualified as indicated in the succeeding sub-subparagraphs 4. Course qualified battery commander or GSM; 5. Preferably obtained a first class qualification on all his SAA courses 6. Occupied the post of battery commander, or unit 2IC, or artillery instructor (School of Artillery, or Combat Training Centre) or GSM for at least one year 7. His conduct, discipline and bearing must be exemplary and to the satisfaction of the Corps Council; 8. He must have a solid reputation as a capable artilleryman amongst his seniors, contemporaries and juniors 9. It will be to his advantage to have participated in a specific operation, or to have served in an operational area for a period of at least three months 10. He must have produced at least one artillery publication which must: 1. Be used in the SAA as reference or training material; 2. Be an original piece of work and the result of research and study; 3. Be approved by the Corps Council	

==== Qualification: Artillery No 1 ====
Artillery No 1
Awarding Authority:	GOC SA Army Artillery Formation	
Description
Dress No 1 – 3 and 5C	Qualification, SA Army Artillery No 1, Chrome (Gun image)	Artillery No 1 (Qualification) Chrome. Gun image
Dress No 5A	Qualification, SA Army Artillery No 1, Miniature, Chrome (Gun image)	Artillery No 1
Dress No 4	Qualification, SA Army Artillery No 1, Black on Thatch beige (Gun image)	Artillery No 1 (Qualification) Black on Thatch beige, Embossed. Gun image
Criteria	1. Qualified on the Ordnance Commanders and Technical Services and Fire Control Course with a first class ranking 2. Hold the rank of sergeant, staff sergeant or warrant officer.	
Note	This identification may not be worn together with the Master Gunner Identification.	

=== Dog Handler's Qualification ===
==== Qualification: Dog Handler ====
Dog Handler
Awarding Authority:	Awarding of this badge has been suspended	
Description
Dress No 1 – 3 and 5C	Qualification, Dog Handler, Chrome and Enamel (Dog’s head on a green background)	Dog Handler
Dress No 5A	Qualification, Dog Handler, Chrome and Enamel, Miniature (Dog’s head on a green background)	Dog Handler
Dress No 4	Qualification, Dog Handler, Black on Thatch beige (Dog’s head)	Dog Handler (Qualification) Handler. Black on Thatch beige, Embossed. Dog’s head
Criteria	Successful completion of the Basic Dog Handler’s Course	

==== Qualification: Dog Instructor ====
Dog Handling Instructor
Awarding Authority:	Awarding of this badge has been suspended	
Description
Dress No 1 – 3 and 5C	Qualification, Dog Instructor, Chrome and Enamel (Dog’s head surrounded by a laurel wreath on a red background)	Dog Instructor
Dress No 5A	Qualification, Dog Instructor, Chrome and Enamel, Miniature (Dog’s head surrounded by a laurel wreath on a red background)	Dog Instructor
Dress No 4	Qualification, Dog Instructor, Black on Thatch beige (Dog’s head surrounded by a laurel wreath)	Dog Handler Instructor (Qualification) Instructor. Black on Thatch beige, Embossed. Dog’s head surrounded by a laurel wreath
Criteria	Successfully completed the PF Dog Instructors Course	

=== Equestrian Qualification ===
==== Qualification: Basic Equestrian ====
Basic Equestrian
Awarding Authority:	Awarding of this badge has been suspended	
Description
Dress No 1 – 3 and 5C	Qualification, Basic Equestrian, Chrome and Enamel (Stirrup with a riding crop on green background)	Basic Equestrian
Dress No 5A	Qualification, Basic Equestrian, Chrome and Enamel, Miniature (Stirrup with a riding crop on green background)	Basic Equestrian
Dress No 4	Qualification, Basic Equestrian, Black on Thatch beige (Stirrup with a riding crop)	Equestrian Basic (Qualification) Rider. Black on Thatch beige, Embossed. Stirrup with a riding crop
Criteria	Qualified on a Basic Equestrian Course	

==== Qualification: Equestrian Instructor ====
Equestrian Instructor
Awarding Authority:	Awarding of this badge has been suspended	
Description
Dress No 1 – 3 and 5C	Qualification, Equestrian Instructor, Chrome and Enamel (Stirrup with a riding crop on a red background)	Equestrian Instructor (Note: The badge description for Instructor/Advanced in the Dress regulations and the Uniform catalogue conflict. Updated description to match the badge)
Dress No 5A	Qualification, Equestrian Instructor, Chrome and Enamel, Miniature (Stirrup with a riding crop on a blue background)	Equestrian Instructor
Dress No 4	Qualification, Equestrian Instructor, Black on Thatch beige (Stirrup with a riding crop with a black circle surrounding the stirrup)	Equestrian Instructor (Qualification) Instructor. Black on Thatch beige, Embossed. Stirrup with a riding crop with a black circle surrounding the stirrup
Criteria	Qualified on an Equestrian Instructor's Course with the following results: 1. Dressage elementary test No 5 - 50%; 2. Show jumping D Level course - 60%; 3. Field obstacles - 60%; 4. Teaching practices - 60%	

==== Qualification: Equestrian Advanced ====
Equestrian Advanced
Awarding Authority:	Awarding of this badge has been suspended	
Description
Dress No 1 – 3 and 5C	Qualification, Equestrian Advanced, Chrome and Enamel (Stirrup with a riding crop on a blue background)	Equestrian Advanced
Dress No 5A	Qualification, Equestrian Advanced, Chrome and Enamel, Miniature (Stirrup with a riding crop on a red background)	Equestrian Advanced
Dress No 4	Qualification, Equestrian Advanced, Black on Thatch beige (Stirrup with a riding crop with a two black circles surrounding the stirrup)	Equestrian Advanced (Qualification) Advanced. Black on Thatch beige, Embossed. Stirrup with a riding crop with a two black circles surrounding the stirrup
Criteria	1. This identification is only awarded to riders of international standard 2. The member must have qualified on an advanced equestrian course or an equivalent foreign course	

=== Parachute Qualification Badges ===
==== Awarding Authority ====
The Awarding Authority is the GOC SA Army Infantry Formation, delegated to the Officer Commanding 44 Parachute Regiment. The qualification badge will be issued on completion of the course and will be controlled by means of a register kept at US 3

==== Qualification: Paratrooper Basic ====
Paratrooper Basic
Awarding Authority:	GOC SA Army Infantry Formation (Note: Delegated to the Officer Commanding 44 Parachute Regiment)	
Description
Dress No 1 – 3 and 5C	Qualification Paratrooper, Gilt Metal and Enamel (Small brass wings with parachute on a blue background)	
Dress No 5A	Qualification Paratrooper, Gilt Metal and Enamel, Miniature (Small brass wings with parachute on a blue background)	
Dress No 4	Qualification Paratrooper, Black on Thatch beige (Small Black wings)	Paratrooper Basic (Qualification) Basic, Static Line. Black on Thatch beige, Embossed. Small Black wings
Criteria	Successfully completed the basic parachute jumping course Mod 701 PARA 1A at 44 Parachute Brigade Training Unit	

==== Qualification: Paratrooper Dispatcher ====
Paratrooper Dispatcher
Awarding Authority:	GOC SA Army Infantry Formation	
Description
Dress No 1 – 3 and 5C	Qualification, Dispatcher, Chrome and Enamel (Small chrome wings with parachute on a blue background)	
Dress No 5A	Qualification, Dispatcher, Chrome and Enamel, Miniature (Small chrome wings with parachute on a blue background)	
Dress No 4	Qualification, Dispatcher, Black on Thatch beige (Small Black wings)	Paratrooper Dispatcher (Qualification) Dispatcher, Static Line. Black on Thatch beige, Embossed. Small Black wings
Criteria	Completed the static line dispatcher’s course Mod 701 PARA 3 at 44 Parachute Brigade Training Unit	

==== Qualification: Paratrooper Instructor ====
Paratrooper Instructor
Awarding Authority:	GOC SA Army Infantry Formation	
Description
Dress No 1 – 3 and 5C	Qualification, Paratrooper Instructor, Chrome and Enamel (Large chrome wings with parachute on a blue background)	
Dress No 5A	Qualification, Paratrooper Instructor, Chrome and Enamel, Miniature (Large chrome wings with parachute on a blue background)	
Dress No 4	Qualification, Paratrooper Instructor, Black on Thatch beige (Large Black wings)	Paratrooper Instructor (Qualification) Instructor, Static Line. Black on Thatch beige, Embossed. Large Black wings
Criteria	Successful completion of the static line instructor’s course Mod 701 PARA 4 at 44 Parachute Brigade Training Unit	

==== Qualification: Free Fall Paratrooper ====
Free Fall Paratrooper
Awarding Authority:	GOC SA Army Infantry Formation	
Description
Dress No 1 – 3 and 5C	Qualification, Paratrooper Free Fall, Chrome and Enamel (Small chrome wings with parachute on a red background)	
Dress No 5A	Qualification, Paratrooper Free Fall, Chrome and Enamel, Miniature (Small chrome wings with parachute on a red background)	
Dress No 4	Qualification, Paratrooper Free Fall, Black on Thatch beige (Small Black wings)	Free Fall Paratrooper (Qualification) Advanced, Freefall. Black on Thatch beige. Small Black wings
Criteria	Successful completion of the basic free fall parachute course Mod 701 PARA 6A at 44 Parachute Brigade Training Unit	

==== Qualification: Paratrooper Free Fall Instructor ====
Paratrooper Free Fall Instructor
Awarding Authority:	GOC SA Army Infantry Formation	
Description
Dress No 1 – 3 and 5C	Qualification, Paratrooper Free Fall Instructor, Chrome and Enamel (Large chrome wings with parachute on a red background)	
Dress No 5A	Qualification, Paratrooper Free Fall Instructor, Chrome and Enamel, Miniature (Large chrome wings with parachute on a red background)	
Dress No 4	Qualification, Paratrooper Free Fall Instructor, Black on Thatch beige (Large Black wings)	Freefall Instructor (Qualification) Instructor, Freefall Qualified. Black on Thatch beige, Embossed. Large Black wings
Criteria	Successful completion of the Free Fall Instructor’s course Mod 701 PARA 8 at 44 Parachute Brigade Training Unit	

=== Pathfinder ===
==== Qualification: Pathfinder ====
Pathfinder
Awarding Authority:	Unknown	
Description
Dress No 1 – 3 and 5C	Qualification - Pathfinder - Service Dress	Pathfinder Badge (Qualification) Bronze metal, Service Dress.
Dress No 5A	Qualification - Pathfinder - Service Dress (Miniature)	Pathfinder Badge
Dress No 4	Qualification Pathfinder, Black on Thatch beige	Pathfinder Badge (Qualification) Black on Thatch beige, Embossed.
Criteria	Successfully completed the Pathfinder Course	

=== Air Assault ===
==== Qualification: Air Assault ====
Air Assault
Awarding Authority:	Unknown (Note: Possibly 6 South African Infantry Battalion)	
Description
Dress No 1 – 3 and 5C	Unknown	
Dress No 5A	Unknown	
Dress No 4	Qualification Air Assault, Black on Thatch beige (Small Helicopter with wings)	Air Assault (Qualification) Black on Thatch beige, Embossed. Small Helicopter with wings
Criteria	Successfully completed the Air Assault course	

=== Musketry Proficiency ===
==== Proficiency: 2nd Class Shot – Rifle ====
2nd Class Shot – Rifle
Awarding Authority:	Unit Commanders	
Description
Dress No 1 – 3 and 5C	Proficiency, 2nd Class Shot, Gilt and Enamel, Chilli with identification, Proficiency marksmen, Gilt (Gilt rifle)	
Dress No 5A	Proficiency, 2nd Class Shot, Gilt and Enamel, Chilli, Miniature, with identification, Proficiency marksmen, Gilt (Gilt miniature rifle)	
Dress No 4	Proficiency, 2nd Class Shot, Black on Thatch beige, with identification, Proficiency marksmen, Black (Black rifle)	2nd Class Shot – Rifle (Proficiency) 2^{nd} Class Marksman. Black on Thatch beige, Embossed. Black (Black rifle)
Criteria	Score of 90-104 in rifle exercise Table 2 or 60%	

==== Proficiency: 1st Class Shot – Rifle ====
1st Class Shot – Rifle
Awarding Authority:	Unit Commanders	
Description
Dress No 1 – 3 and 5C	Proficiency, 1st Class Shot, Chrome and Enamel, Chilli with identification, Proficiency marksmen, Chrome (Chrome rifle)	1st Class Shot – Rifle
Dress No 5A	Proficiency, 1st Class Shot, Chrome and Enamel, Chilli, Miniature, with identification, Proficiency marksmen, Chrome (Chrome miniature rifle)	1st Class Shot – Rifle
Dress No 4	Proficiency, 1st Class Shot, Black on Thatch beige, with identification, Proficiency marksmen, Black (Black rifle), with a black rectangle surrounding the rifle	1st Class Shot – Rifle (Proficiency) 1^{st} Class Marksman. Black on Thatch beige, Embossed. Black (Black rifle), with a black rectangle surrounding the rifle
Criteria	Score of 105 Points or more in rifle exercise Table 2 or 70% in the ARSA Watch 1	

==== Qualification: Sniper ====
Sniper
Awarding Authority:	This Identification is currently awarded by both the South African Infantry School and the South African Special Forces Brigade in spite of the two being completely different courses.	
Description
Dress No 1 – 3 and 5C	Qualification Sniper; Chrome and Enamel, Chilli, with identification, Qualification sniper, Chrome (Chrome rifle and laurel wreath)	Sniper
Dress No 5A	Qualification Sniper; Chrome and Enamel, Chilli, Miniature, with identification, Qualification sniper, Chrome (Miniature Chrome rifle and laurel wreath)	Sniper
Dress No 4	Qualification Sniper; Black on Thatch beige, with identification, Qualification sniper, Black (Black rifle and laurel wreath)	Sniper (Qualification) Black on Thatch beige, Embossed. Black rifle and laurel wreath
Criteria	Qualification on an SA Army Sniper’s Qualification Course	

=== Physical Training Instructor's Qualification Badges ===
Awarding Authority: In all cases Director Physical Training Sport and Recreation, SAMHS

==== Qualification: Advanced PT Instructor ====
Advanced Physical Training Instructor
Awarding Authority:	Director: Physical Training Sport and Recreation, SAMHS	
Description
Dress No 1 – 3 and 5C	Qualification PT Instructor, Advanced, Chrome (Crossed sabres under Pride of Lions)	
Dress No 5A	Qualification PT Instructor, Advanced, Miniature, Chrome (Crossed sabres under Pride of Lions)	
Dress No 4	Qualification PT Instructor, Advanced, Black on Thatch beige (Crossed sabres under Pride of Lions)	Physical Training Instructor (Qualification) PTI. Black on Thatch beige, Embossed. Crossed sabres under Pride of Lions
Criteria	Qualification on the PT Instructor’s Course	

==== Qualification: Assistant PT Instructor ====
Assistant Physical Training Instructor
Awarding Authority:	Director: Physical Training Sport and Recreation, SAMHS	
Description
Dress No 1 – 3 and 5C	Qualification PT Instructor, Assistant, Chrome (Crossed sabres)	
Dress No 5A	Qualification PT Instructor, Assistant, Miniature, Chrome (Crossed sabres)	
Dress No 4	Qualification PT Instructor, Assistant, Black on Thatch beige (Crossed sabres)	Assistant Physical Training Instructor (Qualification) Assistant PTI. Black on Thatch beige, Embossed. Crossed sabres
Criteria	Qualification on the assistant PT Instructors Course	

=== Attack Diver ===
==== Qualification: Attack Diver Badge ====
Attack Diver Badge
Awarding Authority:	General Officer Commanding Special Forces	
Description
Dress No 1 – 3 and 5C	Qualification, Attack diver, Bronze (The badge depicts a great white shark swimming past the Neptune trident, which is mounted on the mouthpiece of an Oxygears 57 and is enclosed within the tubes of the Oxygears 57)	
Dress No 5A	Qualification, Attack diver, Bronze, Miniature (The badge depicts a great white shark swimming past the Neptune trident, which is mounted on the mouthpiece of an Oxygears 57 and is enclosed within the tubes of the Oxygears 57)	
Dress No 4	Qualification, Attack diver, Black on Thatch beige (The badge depicts a great white shark swimming past the Neptune trident, which is mounted on the mouthpiece of an Oxygears 57 and is enclosed within the tubes of the Oxygears 57)	Attack Diver (Qualification) Bronze. Black on Thatch beige, Embossed. The badge depicts a great white shark swimming past the Neptune trident, which is mounted on the mouthpiece of an Oxygears 57 and is enclosed within the tubes of the Oxygears 57
Criteria	The bronze qualification badge is awarded to Special Forces’ operators who are proficient Attack Divers	

==== Qualification: Attack Diver Instructor Badge ====
Attack Diver Instructor Badge
Awarding Authority:	General Officer Commanding Special Forces	
Description
Dress No 1 – 3 and 5C	Qualification, Attack diver Instructor, Chrome (The badge depicts a great white shark swimming past the Neptune trident, which is mounted on the mouthpiece of an Oxygears 57 and is enclosed within the tubes of the Oxygears 57)	
Dress No 5A	Qualification, Attack diver Instructor, Chrome, Miniature (The badge depicts a great white shark swimming past the Neptune trident, which is mounted on the mouthpiece of an Oxygears 57 and is enclosed within the tubes of the Oxygears 57)	
Dress No 4	Qualification, Attack diver Instructor, Black on Thatch beige (The badge depicts a great white shark swimming past the Neptune trident, which is mounted on the mouthpiece of an Oxygears 57 and is enclosed within the tubes of the Oxygears 57)	Attack Diver Instructor Badge (Qualification) Silver; Black Circle indicates Instructor. Black on Thatch beige, Embossed. The badge depicts a great white shark swimming past the Neptune trident, which is mounted on the mouthpiece of an Oxygears 57 and is enclosed within the tubes of the Oxygears 57
Criteria	The silver qualification badge is awarded to Special Forces’ operators who are proficient Attack Diver Instructors	

=== Demolitions Qualifications ===
==== Qualification: Explosive Ordnance Disposal (EOD) ====
Explosive Ordnance Disposal (EOD)
Awarding Authority:	OC (Note: Officer Commanding) Ammunition School	
Description
Dress No 1 – 3 and 5C	Qualification, Explosive Ordnance Disposal, Gilt and silver (Gilt metal ring and bomb, facing down, with silver coloured lightning flash)	Explosive Ordnance Disposal (EOD) (Qualification) EOD Badge. Gilt and silver. Gilt metal ring and bomb, facing down, with silver coloured lightning flash
Dress No 5A	Qualification, Explosive Ordnance Disposal, Gilt and silver, Miniature (Gilt metal ring and bomb, facing down, with silver coloured lightning flash)	Explosive Ordnance Disposal (EOD)
Dress No 4	Qualification Explosive Ordnance Disposal, Black on Thatch beige (Ring and bomb, facing down, with lightning flash)	Explosive Ordnance Disposal (EOD) (Qualification) EOD Badge. Black on Thatch beige, Embossed. Ring and bomb, facing down, with lightning flash
Criteria	Qualification on the EOD course at the Ammunition School of the Ammunition Corps.	

==== Qualification: Demolitions Phase 1 Qualification Badge (Dems 1) ====
Demolitions Phase 1 Qualification Badge
Awarding Authority:	GOC Engineer Formation (Delegated in writing to the OC School of Engineers)	
Description
Dress No 1 – 3 and 5C	Qualification, Dems 1, Chrome (The badge uses the traditional 9 flames exploding grenade which is superimposed over one lightning bolt diagonally (top right to bottom left) across the exploding grenade)	Demolitions
Dress No 5A	Qualification, Dems 1, Chrome, Miniature (The badge uses the traditional 9 flames exploding grenade which is superimposed over one lightning bolt diagonally (top right to bottom left) across the exploding grenade)	Demolitions
Dress No 4	Qualification, Dems 1, Black on Thatch beige (The badge uses the traditional 9 flames exploding grenade which is superimposed over one lightning bolt diagonally (top right to bottom left) across the exploding grenade)	Demolitions (Qualification) Level 1 (DEMS1). Black on Thatch beige, Embossed. The badge uses the traditional 9 flames exploding grenade which is superimposed over one lightning bolt diagonally (top right to bottom left) across the exploding grenade
Criteria	Any member who has successfully completed the Dems 1 Course at the School of Engineers may wear the Demolitions Phase 1 Qualification Badge	

==== Qualification: Demolitions Phase 2 Qualification Badge (Tactical Demolitions) ====
Demolitions Phase 2 Qualification Badge (Tactical Demolitions)
Awarding Authority:	GOC Engineer Formation (Delegated in writing to the OC School of Engineers)	
Description
Dress No 1 – 3 and 5C	Qualification, Tac Dems, Chrome (The badge uses the traditional 9 flames exploding grenade, which is superimposed over two crossed lightning bolts across the exploding grenade)	Demolitions
Dress No 5A	Qualification, Tac Dems, Chrome, Miniature (The badge uses the traditional 9 flames exploding grenade, which is superimposed over two crossed lightning bolts across the exploding grenade)	Demolitions
Dress No 4	Qualification, Tac Dems, Black on Thatch beige (The badge uses the traditional 9 flames exploding grenade, which is superimposed over two crossed lightning bolts across the exploding grenade)	Demolitions (Qualification) Level 2 (DEMS2) - Tactical Demolitions. Black on Thatch beige, Embossed. The badge uses the traditional 9 flames exploding grenade, which is superimposed over two crossed lightning bolts across the exploding grenade
Criteria	Demolition Phase 2 Qualification Badge may only be worn by SAEC members who have successfully completed the Dems 2 Course at the School of Engineers	

==== Qualification: Improvised Explosive Device Disposal Qualification Badge (IEDD) ====
Improvised Explosive Device Disposal Qualification Badge (IEDD)
Awarding Authority:	GOC Engineer Formation (Delegated in writing to the OC School of Engineers)	
Description
Dress No 1 – 3 and 5C	Qualification, IEDD, Chrome (The badge uses the traditional 9 flames exploding grenade, which is superimposed, over two crossed lightning bolts. A watch dial, with hour markings, encircles the exploding grenade)	Improvised Explosive Device Disposal (IEDD)
Dress No 5A	Qualification, IEDD, Chrome, Miniature (The badge uses the traditional 9 flames exploding grenade, which is superimposed, over two crossed lightning bolts. A watch dial, with hour markings, encircles the exploding grenade)	Improvised Explosive Device Disposal (IEDD)
Dress No 4	Qualification, IEDD, Black on Thatch beige (The badge uses the traditional 9 flames exploding grenade, which is superimposed, over two crossed lightning bolts. A watch dial, with hour markings, encircles the exploding grenade)	Improvised Explosive Device Disposal (IEDD) (Qualification) IEDD Badge. Black on Thatch beige, Embossed. The badge uses the traditional 9 flames exploding grenade, which is superimposed, over two crossed lightning bolts. A watch dial, with hour markings, encircles the exploding grenade
Criteria	The IEDD Qualification Badge may only be worn by All Arms members who have successfully completed the IEDD Course at the School of Engineers	

=== Fireman’s Qualification Badges ===
1. Awarding Authority: SSO Fire & Rescue Services (Log Div) as the functional competency authority for Fire and Rescue Services in the DOD after completion of training at DOD Fire Training School and recommendation by the OC
2. Limitations on Wearing by Officers: Only officers in posts directly connected with fire fighting may wear the identifications.

==== Qualification: Fire Fighter ====
Fire Fighter
Awarding Authority:	SSO Fire & Rescue Services (Log Div) as the functional competency authority for Fire and Rescue Services in the DOD after completion of training at DOD Fire Training School and recommendation by the OC	
Description
Dress No 1 – 3 and 5C	Qualification, Fire Fighter; Chrome and enamel (Silver helmet and crossed axes on red background)	Fire Fighter
Dress No 5A	Qualification, Fire Fighter; Chrome and enamel, Miniature (Silver helmet and crossed axes on red background)	Fire Fighter
Dress No 4	Qualification, Fire Fighter; Black on Thatch beige (Helmet and crossed axes)	Fire Fighter (Qualification) Black on Thatch beige, Embossed. Helmet and crossed axes
Criteria	Qualification on the Fire Fighter 2 Course (Practical and Theory)	
Limitations on Wearing by Officers	Only officers in posts directly connected with fire fighting may wear the identification.	

==== Qualification: Senior Fire Fighter ====
Senior Fire Fighter
Awarding Authority:	SSO Fire & Rescue Services (Log Div) as the functional competency authority for Fire and Rescue Services in the DOD after completion of training at DOD Fire Training School and recommendation by the OC	
Description
Dress No 1 – 3 and 5C	Qualification, Senior Fire Fighter; Chrome and enamel (Silver helmet and crossed axes on a red background surrounded by a Protea wreath)	Senior Fire Fighter
Dress No 5A	Qualification, Senior Fire Fighter; Chrome and enamel, Miniature (Silver helmet and crossed axes on a red background surrounded by a Protea wreath)	Senior Fire Fighter
Dress No 4	Qualification, Senior Fire Fighter; Black on Thatch beige (Helmet and crossed axes surrounded by a Protea wreath)	Senor Fire Fighter (Qualification) Senior. Black on Thatch beige, Embossed. Helmet and crossed axes surrounded by a Protea wreath
Criteria	Qualification on the successful completion of Fire Officer 1 Course (SAESI) or Higher Certificate in Fire Technology,(Technicon 1st year)	
Limitations on Wearing by Officers	Only officers in posts directly connected with fire fighting may wear the identification.	

=== Motorcyclist Qualification ===
==== Qualification: Motor Cyclist ====
Motor Cyclist
Awarding Authority:	Award of this badge has been suspended	
Description
Dress No 1 – 3 and 5C	Qualification, Cyclist, Chrome and Enamel (Motor cycle wheel on a green background)	Motor Cyclist
Dress No 5A	Qualification, Cyclist, Chrome and Enamel, Miniature (Motor cycle wheel on a green background)	Motor Cyclist
Dress No 4	Qualification, Cyclist, Black on Thatch beige (Motor cycle wheel)	Motorcyclist (Qualification) Black on Thatch beige, Embossed. Motor cycle wheel
Criteria	Qualified on a Basic Motor Cycle Course	

==== Qualification: Motor Cycle Instructor ====
Motor Cycle Instructor
Awarding Authority:	Award of this badge has been suspended	
Description
Dress No 1 – 3 and 5C	Qualification, Motor Cycle Instructor, Chrome and Enamel (Motor cycle wheel on a red background)	Motor Cycle Instructor
Dress No 5A	Qualification, Motor Cycle Instructor, Chrome and Enamel, Miniature (Motor cycle wheel on a red background)	Motor Cycle Instructor
Dress No 4	Qualification, Motor Cycle Instructor, Black on Thatch beige (Motor cycle wheel with a black circle surrounding the wheel)	Motorcyclist Instructor (Qualification) Instructor. Black on Thatch beige, Embossed. Motor cycle wheel with a black circle surrounding the wheel
Criteria	Qualified on a Motor Cycle Instructor’s Course	

=== Pilots ===
Pilot's Insignia
Pilots Wings (Qualification) 0-500 hrs. Black on Thatch beige, Embossed. National Coat of Arms with large wings	Pilots Wings (Qualification) 500-2500 hrs. Black on Thatch beige, Embossed. National Coat of Arms with large wings enclosed by one black rectangle	Pilots Wings (Qualification) 2500 plus hrs. Black on Thatch beige, Embossed. National Coat of Arms with large wings enclosed by two black rectangles

=== Special Forces ===
==== Qualification: Special Forces Operator Badge ====
Special Forces Operator Badge
Awarding Authority:	GOC Special Forces approves the awarding of the Special Forces Operators Badge on the recommendation of an internal selection board	
Description
Dress No 1 – 3 and 5C	Qualification, Special Forces Operator, Chrome (Chrome dagger enclosed with a laurel wreath)	SA Special Forces Operator's Badge
Dress No 5A	Qualification, Special Forces Operator, Chrome, Miniature (Chrome dagger enclosed with a laurel wreath)	SA Special Forces Operator's Badge
Dress No 4	Qualification, Special Forces Operator, Black on Thatch beige (Dagger enclosed with a laurel wreath)	SA Special Forces Operator's Badge (Qualification) Black on Thatch beige, Embossed. Dagger enclosed with a laurel wreath
Criteria	The badge is only awarded to members on successful completion of the Special Forces Basic Cycle	
Note	The identification does not have a stock number, and is issued according to a numerical sequence. (The master list is maintained by Special Forces Headquarters)	

==== Qualification: Special Forces Operator Identification (Gold, 10 Years) ====
Special Forces Operator Identification (Gold, 10 Years)
Awarding Authority:	GOC Special Forces	
Description
Dress No 1 – 3 and 5C	Qualification, Special Forces Operator Gold (9 Carat gold dagger enclosed with a laurel wreath with a .35 carat diamond set in the centre of the dagger)	SA Special Forces Operator's Badge
Dress No 5A	Qualification, Special Forces Operator Gold, Miniature (Gilt dagger enclosed with a laurel wreath)	SA Special Forces Operator's Badge
Dress No 4	Qualification, Special Forces Operator Gold, Black on Thatch beige (Dagger enclosed with a laurel wreath surrounded by a black circle)	SA Special Forces Operator's Badge (Qualification) Gold, 10 Years. Black on Thatch beige, Embossed. Dagger enclosed with a laurel wreath. Exclusion to indicate diamond on Dagger blade.
Criteria	The member must have completed 10 years service within the Special Forces Headquarters or subordinate units as a qualified Special Forces Operator	

==== Qualification: Forward Air Controller ====
Please note that this award is made on completion of a Forward Air Controller's course. The course is an Air Force course, not an Army one. The awarding authority is thus most likely a senior officer in the air force.

Forward Air Controller (Qualification)
Yellow triangle with two yellow lines on thatch background

==== Qualification: Submarine Operator ====
No details of this qualification badge are documented in the sources currently cited on this page.

=== Tracking Qualifications ===
==== Qualification: Tracker ====
Tracker
Awarding Authority:	Awarding of this badge has been suspended	
Description
Dress No 1 – 3 and 5C	Qualification, Tracker, Chrome and Enamel (chevron footprint on a green background)	
Dress No 5A	Qualification, Tracker, Chrome and Enamel, Miniature (chevron footprint on a green background)	
Dress No 4	Qualification, Tracker, Black on Thatch beige (chevron footprint)	Tracker (Qualification) Black on Thatch beige, Embossed. Chevron footprint
Criteria	Qualified on a Basic Tracking Course	

==== Qualification: Tracker Instructor ====
Tracker Instructor
Awarding Authority:	Awarding of this badge has been suspended	
Description
Dress No 1 – 3 and 5C	Qualification, Tracker Instructor, Chrome and Enamel (Chevron footprint on a red background)	
Dress No 5A	Qualification, Tracker Instructor, Chrome and Enamel, Miniature (Chevron footprint on a red background)	
Dress No 4	Qualification, Tracker Instructor, Black on Thatch beige (Chevron footprint with a black circle surrounding the footprint).	Tracker Instructor (Qualification) Instructor. Black on Thatch beige, Embossed. Chevron footprint with a black circle surrounding the footprint
Criteria	Qualified on a Tracker Instructor’s Course	

=== Internal Auditor & Investigator ===
Internal Auditor & Investigator
Awarding Authority:	Unknown	
Description
Dress No 1 – 3 and 5C	Qualification - Internal Audit Investigation - Service Dress	Internal Auditor & Investigator
Dress No 5A	Qualification - Internal Audit Investigation - Service Dress (Miniature)	Internal Auditor & Investigator
Dress No 4	Qualification - Internal Audit Investigation - Embossed	Internal Audit Practitioner (Qualification) Black on Thatch beige, Embossed. Internal Audit Investigation
Criteria	Unknown	

=== Military Law ===
Military Law Practitioner
Awarding Authority:	Unknown	
Description
Dress No 1 – 3 and 5C	Qualification - Military Law Practitioner - Service Dress	Military Law Practitioner
Dress No 5A	Qualification - Military Law Practitioner - Service Dress (Miniature)	Military Law Practitioner
Dress No 4	Qualification - Military Law Practitioner - Embossed	Military Law Practitioner (Qualification) Black on Thatch beige, Embossed. Scales of Justice surrounded by a Laurel Wreath
Criteria	Unknown	

=== SA Corps of Bandsmen ===
Corps of Bandsmen Insignia
Description	Service Dress	Embossed
Musician	Musician (Qualification/Post) Musician (SACB). Silver Gilt, Service Dress. Gilt badge. Lyre with a wreath	Musician (Qualification/Post) Musician (SACB). Black on Thatch beige, Embossed. Round badge. Lyre with a wreath
Senior Musician	Senior Musician (Qualification/Post) Senior Musician (SACB). Silver Gilt on Red Backing, Service Dress. Gilt badge. Lyre with a wreath on red backing	Senior Musician (Qualification/Post) Senior Musician (SACB). Black on Thatch beige, Embossed. Round badge. Lyre with a wreath enclosed in a black circle
Principle Musician	Principal Musician (Qualification/Post) Principal Musician (SACB). Bronze Gilt, Service Dress. Gilt badge. Lyre with a wreath	Principal Musician (Qualification/Post) Principal Musician (SACB). Black on Thatch beige, Embossed. Square badge. Lyre with a wreath
Chief Musician	Chief Musician (Qualification/Post) Chief Musician (SACB). Bronze Gilt on Red Backing, Service Dress. Gilt Badge. Lyre with a wreath on a red backing.	Chief Musician (Qualification/Post) Chief Musician (SACB). Black on Thatch beige, Embossed. Square Badge. Lyre with a wreath enclosed in a black square.
Group Leader	Group Leader (Qualification/Post) Group Leader (SACB). Silver Gilt. Silver Gilt badge. Lyre with a wreath, surrounded by a Laurel Wreath.	Group Leader (Qualification/Post) Group Leader (SACB). Black on Thatch beige, Embossed. Lyre with a wreath, surrounded by a Laurel Wreath.
Band Master	Band Master (Qualification/Post) Band Master (SACB). Silver Gilt. Silver Gilt Badge. Lyre with a wreath, surrounded by a Laurel Wreath.	Band Master (Qualification/Post) Band Master (SACB). Black on Thatch beige, Embossed. Lyre with a wreath, surrounded by a Laurel Wreath enclosed within a black circle.
Music Director	Director of Music (Qualification/Post) SACB. Gold Gilt Badge, Service Dress. Gold Gilt Badge. Lyre with a wreath, surrounded by a Laurel Wreath	Director of Music (Qualification/Post) SACB. Black on Thatch beige, Embossed. Square Badge. Lyre with a wreath, surrounded by a Laurel Wreath
Senior Director	Senior Director of Music (Qualification/Post) SACB. Gold Gilt Badge on Red Backing, Service Dress. Gold Gilt Badge on red backing. Lyre with a wreath, surrounded by a Laurel Wreath.	Senior Director of Music (Qualification/Post) SACB. Black on Thatch beige, Embossed. Square Badge. Lyre with a wreath, surrounded by a Laurel Wreath, enclosed in a black square.

=== Insignia: Chaplains ===
==== Chaplain Accouterments ====
Chaplain Accouterments
Headdress	BERET - CHAPLAINS CORPS - SPECTRUM VIOLET	Chaplain Corps beret
	BADGE CAP - GENERAL OFFICER - CHAPLAIN GENERAL - REGULAR - GOLD WIRE EMBROIDERY	Chaplain General cap badge
Branch of Service	INSIGNIA - BRANCH OF SERVICE SA ARMY - COLLAR - CHAPLAINS - MMD - GILT	Chaplain collar badge
	LANYARD - CHAPLAINS - SPECTRUM VIOLET - MEN	Chaplain lanyard
Gorgets	GORGET - PATCH SA ARMY - CHAPLAINS (NON STAFF QUALIFIED)	Chaplain gorget patch
	GORGET - PATCH SA ARMY - CHAPLAINS - SPECTRUM VIOLET WITH GOLD LACE (STAFF QUALIFIED)	Chaplain gorget patch
	GORGET - PATCH SA ARMY - GENERAL OFFICERS - CHAPLAINS - SPECTRUM VIOLET	Chaplain gorget patch

==== Chaplain, Christian ====
Chaplain, Christian
Dress No 1 – 3 and 5C	BADGE - RANK SA ARMY - CHAPLAINS - CHROME AND ENAMEL	Chaplain rank badge
Dress No 5A		Chaplain rank badge
Dress No 4	BADGE, RANK; CHAPLAINS, CHRISTIAN	Chaplain rank insignia (Note: CD502 — BADGE, RANK; CHAPLAINS, CHRISTIAN)
Qualification	Qualification Chaplain Christian badge embossed	Chaplain, Christian

==== Chaplain, Hindu ====
Chaplain, Hindu
Dress No 1 – 3 and 5C	SHOULDER BOARD - SA ARMY - HINDU CHAPLAIN	Chaplain shoulder board
Dress No 5A		
Dress No 4	BADGE, RANK; CHAPLAINS, HINDU	Chaplain rank insignia (Note: CD502 — BADGE, RANK; CHAPLAINS, HINDU)
	Qualification Chaplain Hindu badge embossed	Chaplain, Hindu

==== Chaplain, Jewish ====
Chaplain, Jewish
Dress No 1 – 3 and 5C	SHOULDER BOARD - SA ARMY - JEWISH CHAPLAIN	Chaplain shoulder board
	SANDF - BADGE - QUALIFICATION CHAPLAIN JEWISH FAITH	Chaplain, Jewish
Dress No 5A		
Dress No 4	BADGE, RANK; CHAPLAINS, JEWISH	Chaplain rank insignia (Note: CD502 — BADGE, RANK; CHAPLAINS, JEWISH)
	Qualification Chaplain Jewish badge embossed	Chaplain, Jewish

==== Chaplain, Muslim ====
Chaplain, Muslim
Dress No 1 – 3 and 5C	SHOULDER BOARD - SA ARMY - MUSLIM CHAPLAIN	Chaplain shoulder board
Dress No 5A		
Dress No 4	BADGE, RANK; CHAPLAINS, MUSLIM	
	Qualification Chaplain Muslim badge embossed	Chaplain, Muslim

== Branch of Service ==
Branch of Service/Corps: Service Dress Insignia and Headress
Branch	Insignia	Beret
South African Artillery	South African Artillery collar badge	South African Artillery beret
Chaplains	Chaplain collar badge	Chaplain Corps beret
Ordnance Service Corps	Ordnance Service Corps collar badge	Ordnance Service Corps beret
SA Infantry Corps (SAIC)		SA Infantry Corps beret
SA Staff Corps		SA Staff Corps beret
SA Ammunition Corps	SA Ammunition Corps collar badge	SA Ammunition Corps beret
SA Army Intelligence	SA Army Intelligence collar badge	
SA Caterers Corps	SA Caterers Corps collar badge	SA Catering Corps beret
SA Armour Corps (SAAC)	SA Armour Corps collar badge	SA Armour Corps beret
SA Air Defence Artillery (SAADA)	SA Air Defence Artillery collar badge	South African Artillery beret
SA Artillery Corps		South African Artillery beret
SA Corps of Military Police (SACMP)	Corps of Military Police collar badge	Corps of Military Police beret
SA Corps of Signals (SACS)	SA Corps of Signals collar badge SA Corps of Signals collar badge	SA Corps of Signals beret
SA Engineers Corps (SAEC)	SA Engineer Corps collar badge	SA Corps of Engineers beret
SANDF Intelligence	SANDF Intelligence collar badge	
Technical Service Corps (TSC)	Technical Service Corps collar badge Technical Service Corps collar badge	Technical Service Corps beret
Personnel Service Corps (PSC)	Personnel Service Corps collar badge Personnel Service Corps collar badge	Personnel Service Corps beret
National Ceremonial Guard	National Ceremonial Guard cap badge	National Ceremonial Guard beret
SA Corps of Bandsmen (SACB)	SA Corps of Bandsmen cap badge	
Paratroopers		Paratrooper beret
SANDF Brassard (Red Cross)	Medical brassard	

== Rank Insignia ==
=== Rank Insignia: Officers ===
Officer's rank is made up of a few components, including the "Star" and the "Crest" (A part of the National Coat of Arms)

Elements of Officer's Rank: Service Dress
Description	Insignia
9 Point Star	Officer rank star
Crest	Officer crest badge Officer crest badge
MMD - Collar Badge - Cols	Colonel collar badge Colonel collar badge
Rank - Officer - SA Army - General	General General

==== General ====
Rank: General
Dress No 1 – 3 and 5C	SHOULDER BOARD, SA ARMY; GENERAL	General
Dress No 5A		
Dress No 4	INSIGNIA, RANK, COLLAR, GENERAL	General General (Note: CD502 — INSIGNIA, RANK, COLLAR, GENERAL)

==== Lt General ====
Rank: Lt General
Dress No 1 – 3 and 5C	SHOULDER BOARD - SA ARMY - LIEUTENANT GENERAL	Lieutenant General
Dress No 5A		
Dress No 4	INSIGNIA, RANK, COLLAR, LIEUTENANT GENERAL	Lieutenant General (Note: CD502 — INSIGNIA, RANK, COLLAR, LIEUTENANT GENERAL)

==== Major General ====
Rank: Major General
Dress No 1 – 3 and 5C	SHOULDER BOARD - SA ARMY - MAJOR GENERAL	Major General
Dress No 5A		
Dress No 4	INSIGNIA, RANK, COLLAR, MAJOR GENERAL	Major General (Note: CD502 — INSIGNIA, RANK, COLLAR, MAJOR GENERAL)

==== Brigadier General ====
Rank: Brigadier General
Dress No 1 – 3 and 5C	SHOULDER BOARD - SA ARMY - BRIGADIER GENERAL	Brigadier General
Dress No 5A		Colonel collar badge; Officer rank star; General
Dress No 4	INSIGNIA, RANK, COLLAR, BRIGADIER GENERAL	Brigadier General (Note: CD502 — INSIGNIA, RANK, COLLAR, BRIGADIER GENERAL)

==== Colonel ====
Rank: Colonel
Dress No 1 – 3 and 5C	SHOULDER BOARD - SA ARMY - COLONEL	Colonel
Dress No 5A		
Dress No 4	INSIGNIA, RANK, COLLAR, COLONEL	Colonel (Note: CD502 — INSIGNIA, RANK, COLLAR, COLONEL)

==== Lieutenant Colonel ====
Rank: Lieutenant Colonel
Dress No 1 – 3 and 5C	SHOULDER BOARD - SA ARMY - LIEUTENANT COLONEL	Lieutenant Colonel
Dress No 5A		
Dress No 4	INSIGNIA, RANK, COLLAR, LIEUTENANT COLONEL	Lieutenant Colonel (Note: CD502 — INSIGNIA, RANK, COLLAR, LIEUTENANT COLONEL)

==== Major ====
Rank: Major
Dress No 1 – 3 and 5C	SHOULDER BOARD - SA ARMY - MAJOR	Major
Dress No 5A		Officer crest badge Officer crest badge
Dress No 4	INSIGNIA, RANK, COLLAR, OFFICER, MAJOR	Major (Note: CD502 — INSIGNIA, RANK, COLLAR, OFFICER, MAJOR)

==== Captain ====
Rank: Captain
Dress No 1 – 3 and 5C	SHOULDER BOARD - SA ARMY - CAPTAIN	Captain
Dress No 5A		
Dress No 4	INSIGNIA, RANK, COLLAR, CAPTAIN	Captain (Note: CD502 — INSIGNIA, RANK, COLLAR, CAPTAIN)

==== Lieutenant ====
Rank: Lieutenant
Dress No 1 – 3 and 5C	SHOULDER BOARD - SA ARMY - LIEUTENANT	Lieutenant
Dress No 5A		
Dress No 4	INSIGNIA, RANK, COLLAR, LIEUTENANT	Lieutenant (Note: CD502 — INSIGNIA, RANK, COLLAR, LIEUTENANT)

==== Second Lieutenant ====
Rank: Second Lieutenant
Dress No 1 – 3 and 5C	SHOULDER BOARD - SA ARMY - SECOND LIEUTENANT	Second Lieutenant
Dress No 5A		Officer rank star
Dress No 4	INSIGNIA, RANK, COLLAR, 2ND LIEUTENANT	Second Lieutenant (Note: CD502 — INSIGNIA, RANK, COLLAR, 2ND LIEUTENANT)

==== Candidate Officer ====
Candidate Officer
- Candidate Officer
- Country: South Africa
- Service branch: South African Army
- Abbreviation: CO
- Rank group: Junior Officers
- Rank: Candidate Officer
- Pay grade: Substantive rank
- Next higher rank: 2nd Lieutenant
- Next lower rank: None
- Equivalent ranks: Midshipman

Rank: Candidate Officer
Dress No 1 – 3 and 5C	SHOULDER BOARD - SA ARMY - CANDIDATE OFFICER	Candidate Officer
Dress No 5A		
Dress No 4	INSIGNIA, RANK, COLLAR, CANDIDATE OFFICER (CO)	Candidate Officer (Note: CD502 — INSIGNIA, RANK, COLLAR, CANDIDATE OFFICER (CO))

=== Rank Insignia: Warrant Officers ===
Warrant Officer Insignia
Description	Insignia
Collar Badge, Service Dress - Senior Warrant	Senior Warrant Officer collar badge

==== SANDF Rank Insignia WO1 Level 1 (Master Chief Warrant Officer) ====
Rank: Master Chief Warrant Officer
Dress No 1 – 3 and 5C	INSIGNIA - RANK - WARRANT OFFICER - COAT OF ARMS - TEAR DROP - WO 1 — MASTER CHIEF	Master Chief Warrant Officer
Dress No 5A		
Dress No 4	INSIGNIA, RANK, COLLAR, WO1 LEVEL 1/MASTER CHIEF WO	Master Chief Warrant Officer (Note: CD502 — INSIGNIA, RANK, COLLAR, WO1 LEVEL 1/MASTER CHIEF WO)

==== SANDF Rank Insignia WO1 Level 2 (Senior Chief Warrant Officer) ====
Rank: Senior Chief Warrant Officer
Dress No 1 – 3 and 5C	INSIGNIA - RANK - WARRANT OFFICER - COAT OF ARMS - TEAR DROP - WO 1 — SENIOR CHIEF	Senior Chief Warrant Officer
Dress No 5A		
Dress No 4	INSIGNIA, RANK, COLLAR, WO1 LEVEL 2/SENIOR CHIEF WO	Senior Chief Warrant Officer (Note: CD502 — INSIGNIA, RANK, COLLAR, WO1 LEVEL 2/SENIOR CHIEF WO)

==== SANDF Rank Insignia WO1 Level 3 (Chief Warrant Officer) ====
Rank: Chief Warrant Officer
Dress No 1 – 3 and 5C	INSIGNIA - RANK - WARRANT OFFICER - COAT OF ARMS - TEAR DROP - WO 1 — CHIEF	Chief Warrant Officer
Dress No 5A		
Dress No 4	INSIGNIA, RANK, COLLAR, WO1 LEVEL 3/CHIEF WO	Chief Warrant Officer (Note: CD502 — INSIGNIA, RANK, COLLAR, WO1 LEVEL 3/CHIEF WO)

==== SANDF Rank Insignia WO1 Level 4a (Master Warrant Officer) ====
Rank: Master Warrant Officer
Dress No 1 – 3 and 5C	INSIGNIA - RANK - WARRANT OFFICER - COAT OF ARMS - TEAR DROP - WO 1 — MASTER	Master Warrant Officer
Dress No 5A		
Dress No 4	INSIGNIA, RANK, COLLAR, WO1 LEVEL 4A/MASTER WO	Master Warrant Officer (Note: CD502 — INSIGNIA, RANK, COLLAR, WO1 LEVEL 4A/MASTER WO)

==== SANDF Rank Insignia WO1 Level 4b (Senior Warrant Officer) ====
Rank: Senior Warrant Officer
Dress No 1 – 3 and 5C	INSIGNIA - RANK - OFFICER - COAT OF ARMS - TEAR DROP - WO 1 — SENIOR	Senior Warrant Officer
Dress No 5A		
Dress No 4	INSIGNIA, RANK, COLLAR, WO1 LEVEL 4B/SENIOR WO	Senior Warrant Officer (Note: CD502 — INSIGNIA, RANK, COLLAR, WO1 LEVEL 4B/SENIOR WO)

==== SANDF Rank Insignia WO1 (Warrant Officer 1st Class) ====
Warrant Officer Class 1
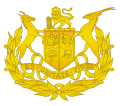
- WOI (1951–2002)

- WO 1
- Country: South Africa
- Service branch: South African Army
- Abbreviation: WO1, Sgt Major,
- Rank group: Warrant Officer
- Rank: Warrant officer class 1
- Pay grade: OR-10
- Next higher rank: Senior Warrant Officer
- Next lower rank: Warrant officer class 2
- Equivalent ranks: Sgt Major; RSM; Post name

Rank: Warrant Officer 1st Class
Dress No 1 – 3 and 5C	INSIGNIA - RANK - WARRANT OFFICER - COAT OF ARMS - TEAR DROP - WO 1	Warrant Officer Class 1
Dress No 5A		
Dress No 4	INSIGNIA, RANK, COLLAR, WO1	Warrant Officer Class 1 (Note: CD502 — INSIGNIA, RANK, COLLAR, WO1)

==== SANDF Rank Insignia WO2 (Warrant Officer 2nd Class) ====
Warrant Officer Class 2
- WOII (1951–2002)

- WO II
- Country: South Africa
- Service branch: South African Army
- Abbreviation: WO2, Sgt Major
- Rank group: Warrant Officer
- Rank: Warrant officer class 2
- Pay grade: OR-8
- Next higher rank: Warrant Officer Class 2
- Next lower rank: Staff Sergeant
- Equivalent ranks: Sgt Major

Rank: Warrant Officer 2nd Class
Dress No 1 – 3 and 5C	INSIGNIA - RANK - WARRANT OFFICER - COAT OF ARMS - OVAL - WO 2	Warrant Officer Class 2
Dress No 5A		
Dress No 4	INSIGNIA, RANK, COLLAR, WO2	Warrant Officer Class 2 (Note: CD502 — INSIGNIA, RANK, COLLAR, WO2)

=== Rank Insignia: NCOs ===
==== Staff Sergeant ====
Staff Sergeant
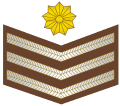
- Staff Sergeant (1994–2002)

- Staff Sergeant
- Country: South Africa
- Service branch: South African Army
- Abbreviation: S/Sgt
- Rank group: Senior NCO
- Rank: Staff Sergeant
- Pay grade: OR6
- Next higher rank: Warrant Officer Class I
- Next lower rank: Sergeant
- Equivalent ranks: Flight sergeant; Chief Petty Officer

Rank: Staff Sergeant
Dress No 1 – 3 and 5C	INSIGNIA - RANK - NON-COMMISSIONED OFFICER SA ARMY - STAFF SERGEANT - SERVICE DRESS	Staff Sergeant
Dress No 5A		
Dress No 4	INSIGNIA, RANK, COLLAR, STAFF SERGEANT	Staff Sergeant (Note: CD502 — INSIGNIA, RANK, COLLAR, STAFF SERGEANT)

==== Sergeant ====
Sergeant
- Sergeant (1994–2002)

- Sergeant; One who serves (serviens)
- Country: South Africa
- Service branch: South African Army
- Abbreviation: Sgt
- Rank group: Senior NCO
- Rank: Sergeant
- Pay grade: OR5
- Next higher rank: Staff Sergeant
- Next lower rank: Corporal
- Equivalent ranks: Petty officer

Rank: Sergeant
Dress No 1 – 3 and 5C	INSIGNIA - RANK - NON-COMMISSIONED OFFICER SA ARMY - SERGEANT - SERVICE DRESS	Sergeant
Dress No 5A		
Dress No 4	INSIGNIA, RANK, COLLAR, SERGEANT	Sergeant (Note: CD502 — INSIGNIA, RANK, COLLAR, SERGEANT, CORPORAL AND LANCE CORPORAL)

==== Corporal ====
Corporal
- Corporal (1994–2002)

- Corporal (Field Dress)
- Country: South Africa
- Service branch: South African Army
- Abbreviation: Cpl
- Rank group: Junior NCO
- Rank: Corporal
- Pay grade: OR4
- Next higher rank: Sergeant
- Next lower rank: Lance Corporal
- Equivalent ranks: Bombardier Leading Seaman

Rank: Corporal
Dress No 1 – 3 and 5C	INSIGNIA - RANK - NONCOMISSIONED OFFICER SA ARMY - CORPORAL - SERVICE DRESS	Corporal
Dress No 5A		
Dress No 4	INSIGNIA, RANK, COLLAR, CORPORAL	Corporal (Note: CD502 — INSIGNIA, RANK, COLLAR, SERGEANT, CORPORAL AND LANCE CORPORAL)

==== Lance Corporal ====
Lance Corporal
- Lance Corporal (Service Dress)

- Lance Corporal (1994–2002)
- Country: South Africa
- Service branch: South African Army
- Abbreviation: L/Cpl
- Rank group: Junior NCO
- Rank: Lance Corporal
- Pay grade: OR3
- Next higher rank: Corporal
- Next lower rank: Private
- Equivalent ranks: Lance Bombardier Able Seaman

Rank: Lance Corporal
Dress No 1 – 3 and 5C	INSIGNIA - RANK - NON-COMMISSIONED OFFICER SA ARMY - LANCE CORPORAL - SERVICE DRESS	Lance Corporal
Dress No 5A		
Dress No 4	INSIGNIA, RANK, COLLAR, LANCE CORPORAL	Lance Corporal (Note: CD502 — INSIGNIA, RANK, COLLAR, SERGEANT, CORPORAL AND LANCE CORPORAL)

== SAMHS ==
=== Proficiency insignia of the South African Military Health Service ===
Service Dress SAMHS Proficiency badges
Medical Doctor (Qualification) Chest Insignia. Gilt and Enamel.	Nurse (Qualification) Chest Insignia. Gilt and Enamel.	OPS Medic (Qualification) Chest Insignia. Gilt and Enamel.
Pharmacist (Qualification) Chest Insignia. Gilt and Enamel.	Psychologist (Qualification) Chest Insignia. Gilt and Enamel.	Veterinarian (Qualification) Chest Insignia. Gilt and Enamel.
Welfare Officer (Qualification) Chest Insignia. Gilt and Enamel.	Health Inspector (Qualification) Chest Insignia. Gilt and Enamel.	Ancillary Health (Qualification) Chest Insignia. Gilt and Enamel.
Farrier (Qualification) Chest Insignia. Gilt and Enamel.	Administrative (Qualification) Chest Insignia. Gilt and Enamel.	

==== 7 Medical Battalion Group ====
Service Dress SAMHS 7 Medical Battalion Proficiency badges
Medical Doctor / 7 MED (Qualification) Chest Insignia. Gilt and Enamel. Dagger instead of a staff	OPS Medic / 7 MED (Qualification) Chest Insignia. Gilt and Enamel. Dagger instead of a staff

== See also ==
- List of Helmet and Shoulder Flashes and Hackles of South African Military Units
- South African Army corps and branches
