= Habibur Rahman (police officer) =

Bangladeshi police officer

- হাবিবুর রহমান
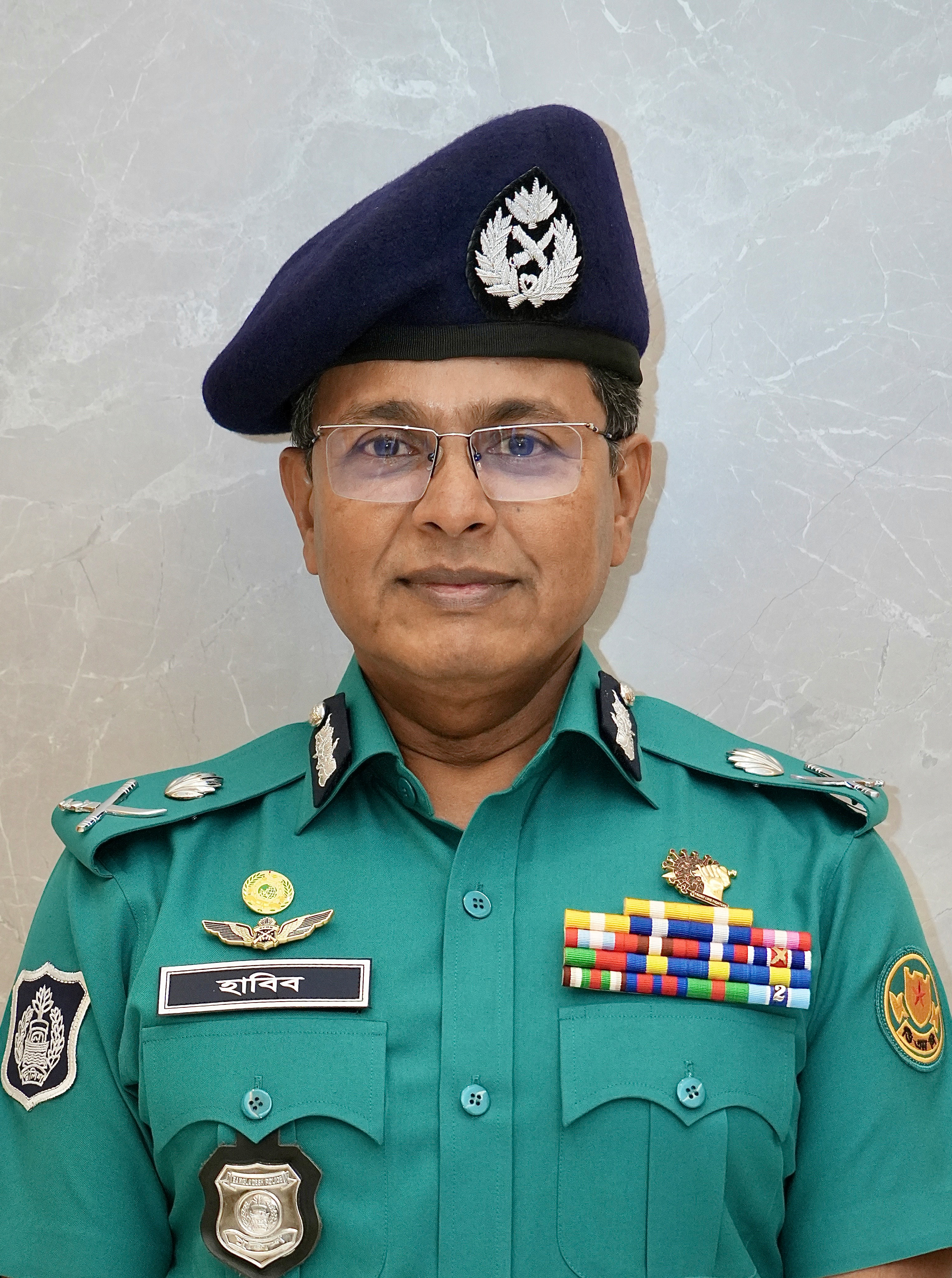
- Habib in 2024

35th Police Commissioner of Dhaka Metropolitan Police
- In office 30 September 2023 – 5 August 2024
- Appointed by: Minister of Home Affairs
- Preceded by: Khandker Golam Faruq
- Succeeded by: Md. Mainul Hasan

Personal details
- Born: 1 January 1967 (age 59) Gopalganj, East Pakistan, Pakistan
- Education: Dhaka University; Government Bangabandhu College, Gopalganj
- Awards: International Mother Language Award
- Police career
- Allegiance: Bangladesh
- Branch: Bangladesh Police
- Service years: 1998–2024
- Status: Retired
- Rank: Additional IGP

Habibur Rahman (Bengali: হাবিবুর রহমান; born 1 January 1967) is a former police officer of Bangladesh. He served as the 35th commissioner of DMP. Prior to joining the DMP, he was head of the Tourist Police. From 2019 to 2022, he was deputy inspector general (DIG) of Dhaka Range, and DIG of administration and discipline at the police headquarters in Dhaka.

Following the political shift in Bangladesh in August 2024, Rahman, along with several other senior police officers, was sent into forced retirement by the interim government of Muhammad Yunus. He subsequently left the country. In January 2026, he was sentenced to death by the International Crimes Tribunal-1 for crimes against humanity committed during the July uprising.

Besides his police responsibilities, Habibur Rahman is known for working for the betterment of underprivileged people of the country, especially trans women and Bede people. He was also the general secretary of the Bangladesh Kabaddi Federation, vice president of the Asian Kabaddi Federation, and vice president of the International Kabaddi Federation.

== Early life ==
Habibur Rahman was born in 1967 at Chandro Dighulia in Gopalganj District, East Pakistan, Pakistan. He completed a master's degree from the Institute of Education and Research, University of Dhaka. He then took the Bangladesh Civil Service (BCS) examination and was selected for the police cadre. On 22 February 1998, he joined the Bangladesh Police as assistant superintendent of police (ASP).

== Career ==
Habibur Rahman came into the limelight when he was Dhaka District superintendent of police. On 23 February 2016, he was promoted to additional deputy inspector general. In 2018, he rose to deputy inspector general (DIG) of administration and discipline at police headquarters, Dhaka. He became DIG of Dhaka Range in 2019. Habibur Rahman was awarded the Bangladesh Police Medal (BPM) three times and the President Police Medal (PPM) twice. In October 2022, he was promoted to the post of additional IG and chief of Bangladesh Tourist Police.

Habibur Rahman is one of the initiators of the Bangladesh Police Liberation War Museum at Rajarbagh Police Lines, Dhaka.

In December 2012, when Habibur Rahman was deputy commissioner (headquarters) of the Dhaka Metropolitan Police (DMP), he founded the Police Blood Bank. It operates out of the Central Police Hospital, Rajarbagh, where anyone, not only police, can donate blood. The blood is supplied to anyone in need, with priority given to donors.

To curb the illegal drug trade in Savar, Habib met with Bede (snake charmer) community leaders to discuss how to rehabilitate families involved in the narcotics business. He involved Bedes in community policing and instituted training programs in driving, sewing, and computer use. He created economic opportunities for them and built roads, mosques, and schools for them and for trans women, another community neglected by society.

Through the Uttaran Foundation, which he established and chairs, Habibur Rahman has supported members of the transgender community starting their business ventures such as beauty parlors, dairy farms, and tailors.

Habibur Rahman also founded an organization called the Uttaran Foundation in 2017. Though it has informally been active since 2013. Habib also established a boutique house named "Uttaran Fashion" for underprivileged people.

Habibur Rahman became general secretary of the Bangladesh Kabaddi Federation in 2016. On 29 August 2018, he was elected vice-president of the Asian Kabaddi Federation.

Habib received the International Mother Language Award - 2023 for his outstanding role in research collaboration on language. His contribution to the collection of Thar language, the almost extinct mother tongue of the Bede community. He also received the JoJo International Iconic Star Award 2023 from the head of state and Governor Melaca, Malaysia, for his tireless endeavors to improve the livelihoods of Bedes and his book 'Thar' on their endangered language.

In 2022, Habib was appointed head of the Tourist Police, and Syed Nurul Islam replaced him as the deputy inspector general of Dhaka Range.

== Controversies ==
In August 2024, a case was filed against him and 21 others in connection with the death of City University student Md Sajjad Hossain Sajal in Ashulia during the student-led mass movement on August 5.

== Books ==
- Habibur Rahman, ed. (2018). Muktijuddhe Prothom Protirodh [First Resistance in Liberation War]. Dhaka: Panjeree..
- —— (2019). Nondito Sorastro Montri Asaduzzaman Khan Kamal [Nandit Home Minister Asaduzzaman Khan Kamal]. Dhaka: Panjeree.
- —— (2022). Thar. Dhaka: Panjeree.
- —— (2023). Chitipatra: Sheikh Mujibur Rahman. Dhaka: Panjeree.
