= Syed Islam =

Syed Islam may refer to:

- Syed Nazrul Islam
- Syed Zafar Islam
- Syed Manzoorul Islam
- Syed Nurul Islam
- Syed Shafayetul Islam
