= Thar language =

Bengali-based Argot spoken by Bede people

Thar
- ঠার, ঠের, ঠেট
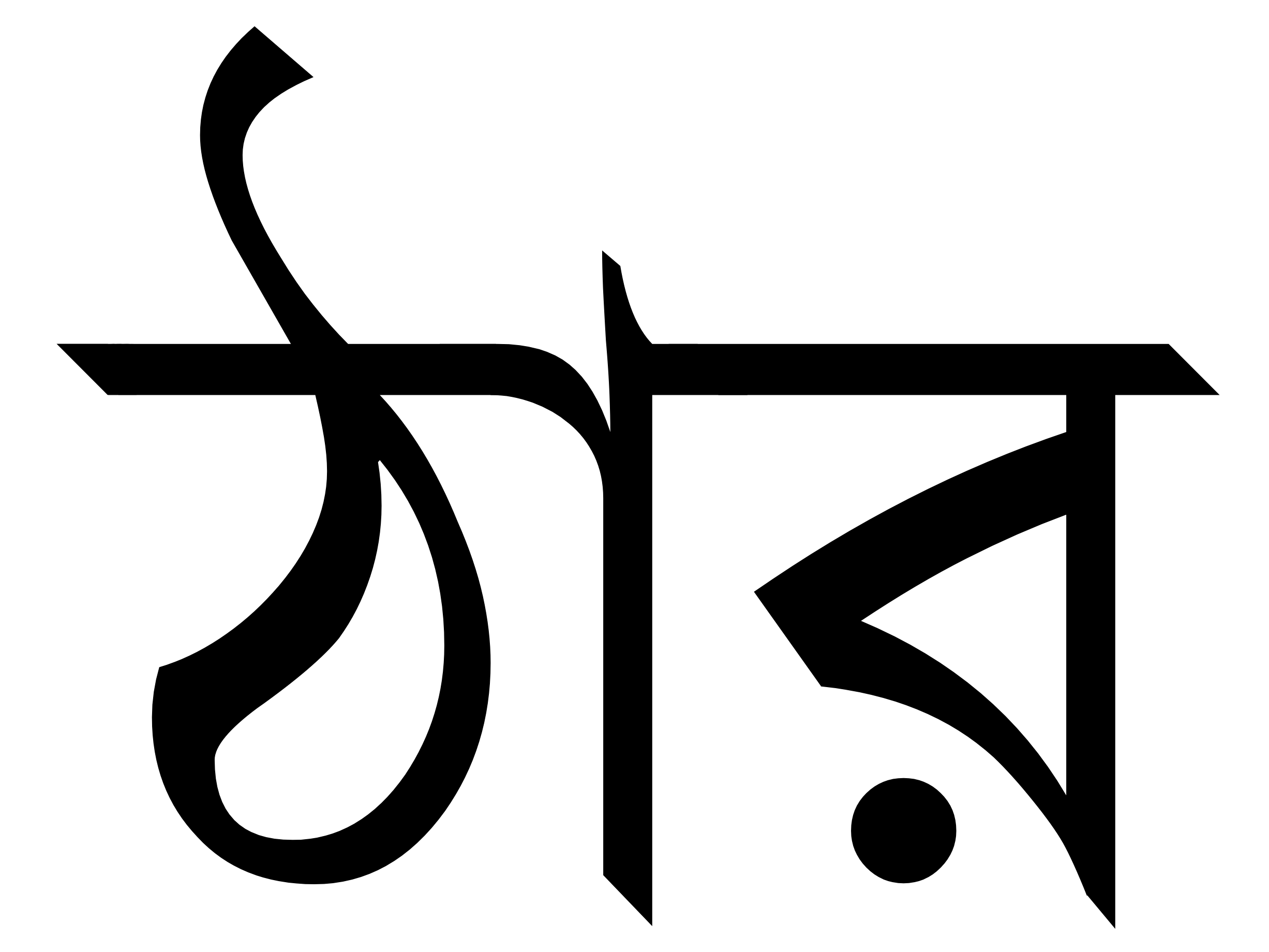
- The word "Thar" in the Bengali-Assamese script
- Native to: Bangladesh and India
- Region: The rivers and coasts of East India and Bengal
- Ethnicity: Bede, Buno and other river gypsies from Bengal and East India
- Speakers: 40,000
- Language family: Argot
- Writing system: Mostly oral; the Bengali-Assamese script is sometimes used

Language codes
- ISO 639-3: None (mis)
- Glottolog: thar1286

Thar (Thar: ঠার Ṭhar), also known as Ther or Thet (Thar: ঠের Ṭher or ঠেট Ṭheṭ) is a Bengali-based Argot spoken by the Bede people, a semi‑nomadic riverine community of Bangladesh and parts of India. The language is predominantly oral, lacking a standardized writing system and is spoken within Bede communities across various districts, upazilas and towns including Savar, Kaliganj, Munshiganj, Sunamganj, Joydevpur, Mirsarai, Cumilla and Sonagazi. Most speakers are bilingual in Bengali. The total number of Thar speakers is not well documented due to the community's mobility, internal dispersion and limited linguistic surveys, some say it is around 40,000. Some say it is an Eastern Indo-Aryan language of the Indo-European family, Chak-Luish or Burmish branch of the Sino-Tibetan family. But most of the time, it is considered an argot because it is a "secret language" used to prevent outsiders from understanding.

== Grammar ==
Thar exhibits distinct linguistic features, including syntax, phonology, phonetic transformations, verb changes, morphology, tenses, moods, genders, sentence structure, and vocabulary. The language contains thousands of basic words, as well as synonyms and antonyms, and shows patterns in how social, economic, cultural and environmental terms are expressed and transformed in its lexicon. Thar exhibits nominal gender and inflects verbs for tense and mood. The language marks three tenses, present, past, and future and employs verb conjugation to express mood. Structurally, Thar follows a subject-object-verb (SOV) word order, similar to neighboring Indo-Aryan languages. Verbs typically take suffixes to indicate tense and mood, a feature also found in Bengali. Thar uses postpositions to mark grammatical relations and maintains a clear distinction between present and past forms. The language's known vocabulary comprises approximately 2,131 words.

=== Phonology ===
Thar utilizes the sounds, phonemes and letters of Bengali, though their pronunciation may vary. Some sounds are retained with identical pronunciation, while others undergo modification.

Phonetic analysis indicates that Thar is based on the fifty letters of the Bengali alphabet. Among these, ten letters ঙ (ṅa), ঞ (ña), ণ (ṇa), ড় (ṛa), ঢ় (ṛha), য় (ya), ৎ (ta), ং (ṅa), ঃ (ḥa) and ঁ (m̐a) are never used as the initial letter of a word. Of the remaining forty letters, thirty-six of them—ক (ka), খ (kha), গ (ga), ঘ (gha), চ (ča), জ (ja/za) , ট (ṭa), ঠ (ṭha), ড (ḍa), ঢ (ḍha), ত (ta), থ (tha), দ (da), ধ (dha), ন (na), প (pa), ফ (pha/fa), ব (ba), ভ (bha), ম (ma), য (ja), র (ra), ল (la), হ (ha), অ (a/ô), আ (ā), ই (i), ঈ (ī), উ (u), ঊ (ū), ঋ (r̥i), এ (e), ঐ (ai), ও (o), ঔ (au), and ৱ (wa/va)—are typically transformed into the sound ঝ (jha/zha) in Thar speech. For example, the Bengali word "চশমা" (čôšma, "glasses") becomes ঝশমা (jhôšma), and বায়ান্ন (bāyānnô, "fifty-two") becomes ঝায়ান্ন (jhāyānnô). Some words begin with ঝ (jha/zha) instead of replacing the first letter completely, this only happens for vowel letters. Such as the word আমি (āmi, "I am") would become ঝামি (jhāmi). The language uses Bengali's all eleven vowels.

Vowels
	Front	Central	Back
Close	ই~ঈ i i		উ~ঊ u u
Close-mid	এ e e		ও o o
Open-mid			অ ɔ ô
Open		আ a a	

Consonants
			Labial	Dental	Retroflex	Palato- alveolar	Velar	Glottal
Nasal			ম m ma	ন n na			ঙ ŋ ṅa	
Plosive/ Affricate	voiceless	unaspirated	প p pa	ত t̪ ta	ট ʈ ṭa	চ tʃ ča	ক k ka	
Plosive/ Affricate	voiceless	aspirated	ফ pʰ pha/fa	থ t̪ʰ tha	ঠ ʈʰ ṭha	ছ tʃʰ čha	খ kʰ kha	
Plosive/ Affricate	voiced	unaspirated	ব b ba	দ d̪ da	ড ɖ ḍa	জ dʒ ja/za	গ ɡ ga	
Plosive/ Affricate	voiced	aspirated	ভ bʱ bha	ধ d̪ʱ dha	ঢ ɖʱ ḍha	ঝ dʒʱ jha/zha	ঘ ɡʱ gha	
Fricative		voiceless	ফ (ɸ) fa	স s sa	ষ ʂ ṣa	শ ʃ ša/śa		হ (h) ha
Fricative		voiced	ভ (β) bha/va	জ (z) za				ঃ ɦ ḥa
Approximant			ৱ (w) wa/va	ল l la		য (j) ja/ya		
Rhotic		unaspirated		র r ra	ড় ɽ ṛa			
Rhotic		aspirated			ঢ় (ɽʱ) ṛha			

Conversely, the letters শ (ša/śa), ষ (ṣa), স (sa), ছ (čha), and ঝ (jha/zha) (not always for ঝ) tend to be replaced with ন (na) in Thar. For instance, শরৎকাল (šôrôtkāl, "autumn") becomes নরৎকাল (nôrôtkāl), and সবুজ (sôbuj, "green") becomes নবুজ (nôbuj). Despite these phonetic transformations, Thar also contains a number of unique, indigenous words not derived from Bengali. Besides ঝ (jha/zha) and ন (na), Sometimes some letters are replaced with খ (kha).

=== Morphology ===
The morphology of Thar has been examined to describe its structure and word formation. The language exhibits distinct patterns in the composition of words and morphemes, indicating both influence from Bengali and the presence of original grammatical features.

== History ==
The Thar language may have derivation from Middle Indo‑Aryan Prakrit forms, suggesting a long history of linguistic formation rather than a recent invention, Ethnographically, Thar shows influence from older Eastern Indo-Aryan forms and from the dialects of Rakhine and Chak speakers in Myanmar, Mizoram and the Chittagong Hill Tracts. Many of its words originate from the early Prakrit form of Bengali. It was also influenced by Persian, Arabic, Portuguese, English and Hindustani besides Bengali and Arakanese.

== Status and usage ==
The Thar language is spoken by Bede or other river gyspy people only, not in mainstream society. The Thar language developed as a "community code" to be used internally. The language has no formal recognition or use in government activities. It is listed among "ethnic languages" in a digitisation project of Bangladesh's government (for 40 endangered ethnic languages) including "Thar". Over time, modern developments have altered the Bede way of life, which in turn impacts the language. For example, more Bede children speak Bengali and fewer speak Thar regularly. Because the language is spoken in scattered communities across the Ganges Delta and plains, it has many dialects, subdialects and variations, some of which are unintelligible to one another.

Today Thar is endangered, the language is used by fewer people, transmission to younger generations is weak and mainstream Bangla (Bengali) dominates.

== Comparison ==
Thar is close to Bengali, Arakanese, Chak and nearby Indo-European languages. Here is a comparison between Standard Bengali, Thar (Dhaka) and Romani (Vlax):

=== Words ===
English	Standard Bengali	Thar (Dhaka)	Romani (Vlax)
Smile	হাসি (Hāsi)	ঝাসি (Jhāsi)	Ásal
Cry	কান্না/কাঁদা (Kānnā/Kāndā)	গেন্ডোই (Gendōi)	Ról
Mouth	মুখ (Mukh)	ঝুক (Jhuk)	Muj
Eye	চোখ (Čokh)	গুনারী (Gunārī)	Jakh
Beautiful	সুন্দর (Sundôr)	নন্দোর/নুন্দর (Nôndōr/Nundôr)	Šukár
Ugly	কুৎসিত (Kutsit)	নাদ্দিনা (Nāddinā)	Žungalo
Small	ছোট (Čhōṭô)	নোট (Nōṭô)	Duduči
Big	বড় (Bôṛô)	ঝড় (Jhôṛô)	Baro
Boat	নৌকা (Nōuka)	বিরকি (Birki)	Hajó
Snake	সাপ (Sāp)	মৌরো (Mōurō)	Sãp
Milk	দুধ (Dudh)	বোমকাই (Bōmkāi)	Thud
Water	জল/পানি (Jal/Pāni)	নিরানী/নিরেনী (Nirānī/Nirenī)	Pani
Papaya	পেঁপে (Pem̐pe)	ঝাঁপা (Jhām̐pā)	Papaya
Slaughterhouse	গোয়াল ঘর (Gōal Ghōr)	লোগুরুর্টশিওদি (Lōgururtšiōdi)	Kasherkher
Door	দরজা (Dôrjā)	খরজা (Khôrjā)	Udar

=== Sentences ===
English	Standard Bengali	Thar (Dhaka)	Romani (Vlax)
Do you like to eat spicy food?	তুই কি মশলাদার/ঝাল খাবার খেতে পছন্দ করিস? (Tui ki môšlādār/jhāl khābār khete pôčhôndô kôris?)	তুই কি পিলপিলে তাগদি ঝশন্দো করফাইশ? (Tui ki pilpile tāgdi jhôšondo kôrfaiš?)	Ći tu laro khǒrňi tšhipa khanav?
Will you come today?	তুই কি আজকে আসবি? (Tui ki ājke āsbi?)	তুই কি ঝাইজগো খাইলফোবি? (Tui ki jhāijgō khāilfōbi?)	Ka av tu aćostante?
Your house is beautiful	আপনাদের বাড়িটা সুন্দর (Āpnāder bāṛiṭā sundôr)	ঝাপনোইদের চেউরিতা নন্দোর/নুন্দর (Jhāpnōider čeuritā nôndōr/nundôr)	Tiri kher si šukár
It is very cold today	আজকে অনেক শীত পড়েছে (Ājke ônek šīt pôṛečhe)	ঝাইজগো ঝনেক নীত পরফাইশে (Jhāijgō jhônek nīt pôrfāiše)	Ame abaškar dure džanes
My dog is very loyal	আমার কুকুরটা খুবই প্রভুভক্ত (Āmār kukurṭā khubi prôbhubhōktô)	ঝামার ঝতিল নাদ্দি (Jhāmār jhôtil nāddi)	Miri džukel si khanato baro phralimos

== In popular culture ==
The Thar language is the subject of a book by Habibur Rahman, titled "Thar: Bede Jonogoshthhir Bhasha" (2022), which describes its grammar, vocabulary and use among native speakers. The book also examines the social and cultural context of the language, including traditional expressions, oral stories, and everyday communication practices. As one of the few sources documenting the language in detail, it has been used in linguistic studies, educational materials and initiatives aimed at promoting awareness and preservation. Through this publication, the language has reached a wider audience beyond its native-speaking community, helping to highlight its distinctive features and the cultural heritage of its speakers. The book has also encouraged interest in further research and documentation of the language, providing a foundation for future works on its structure and usage.

== See also ==
- Romani people
- Bede people
- Buno people
- Romani language

== Bibliography ==
- Rahman, Habibur (2022). Thar: Bede Jonogoshthhir Bhasha (in Bengali). Panjeri Publications. "The first monograph to document the grammar, vocabulary, and sociolinguistic traits of the Thar language."
