= Sekhukhune Anti-Aircraft Regiment =

6 Light Anti-Aircraft Regiment Sekhukhune Anti-Aircraft Regiment
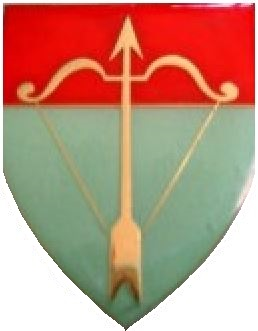
- 6 Light Anti-Aircraft Regiment emblem
- Active: 1 April 1965 – present
- Country: South Africa
- Allegiance: Republic of South Africa; Republic of South Africa
- Branch: South African Army; South African Army
- Type: Reserve Artillery
- Part of: South African Army Air Defence Artillery Formation; Army Conventional Reserve
- Garrison/HQ: Brakpan

Insignia
- Collar Badge: Bursting grenade with seven flames
- Beret Colour: Oxford Blue
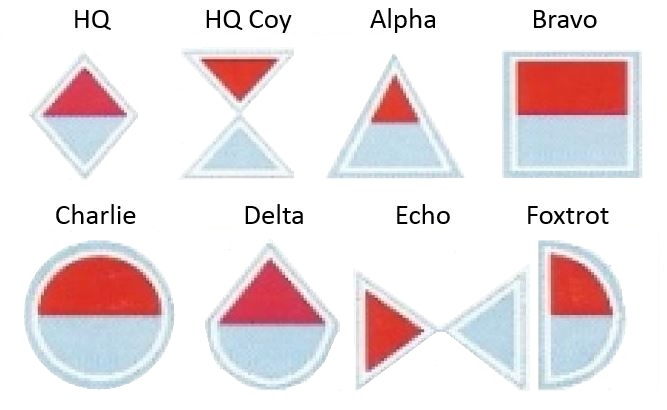
- Battery emblems

- Beret bar circa 1992
- Abbreviation: SAAR

The Sekhukhune Anti-Aircraft Regiment (formerly 6 Light Anti-Aircraft Regiment) is an air defence regiment of the South African Army. It is part of the South African Army Air Defence Artillery Formation. It is located in Johannesburg.

== History ==
6 Light Anti-Aircraft Regiment was officially established on 1 April 1965 with its headquarters in Brakpan at the headquarters of Regiment Oos Transvaal until 1968. It transferred to Springs, and then moved to Johannesburg in 1979.

The first commanding officer was Commandant Dick Inngs, who retired in 1977. He was succeeded by Commandant Nick Irish.

=== Border War ===
The regiment took part in Operation Savannah in 1976 as part of 73 Brigade, part of 7 South African Infantry Division. Two batteries of 35mm Oerlikon GDF AA guns were mobilised for duty on the SWA border to protect Grootfontein and Rundu.

== Freedom of Entry ==
The unit exercised its freedom of entry into Johannesburg on the 9th of November 2013 as part of the centenary celebrations of the City of Johannesburg with fixed bayonets, colours flying and drums beating.

=== Name Change ===
In August 2019, 52 Reserve Force units had their names changed to reflect the diverse military history of South Africa. 6 Light Anti-Aircraft Regiment became the Sekhukhune Anti-Aircraft Regiment, and have 3 years to design and implement new regimental insignia.

== Regimental Symbols ==
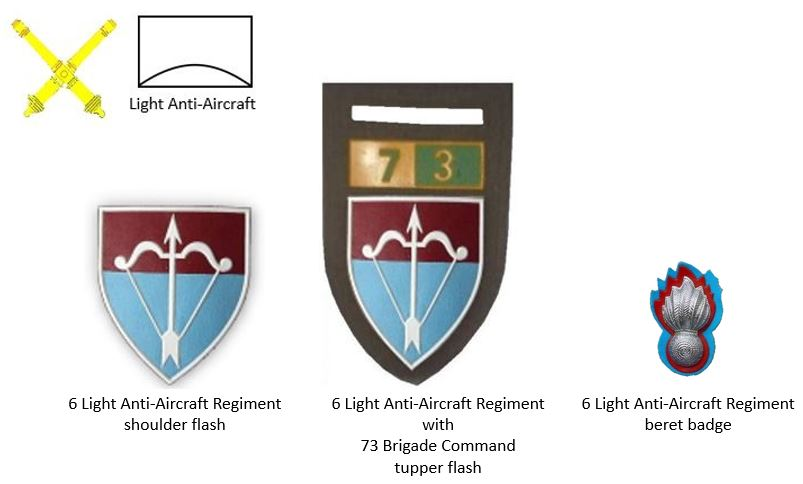
SADF era 6 Light Anti Aircraft Regiment insignia

== Battle Honours ==
- Operation Savannah
