= Regiment Overvaal =

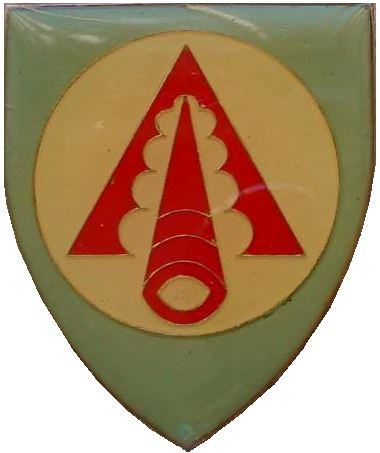
- SANDF Regiment Overvaal emblem
- Active: 1 April 1969 to form 8 Light Anti-Aircraft; 27 April 1973 as Regiment Overvaal
- Country: South Africa
- Allegiance: Republic of South Africa; Republic of South Africa
- Branch: South African Army; South African Army
- Type: Reserve Artillery
- Part of: South African Army Air Defence Artillery Formation; Army Conventional Reserve
- Garrison/HQ: Vereeniging, Gauteng
- Mottos: Ense Et Aratro Serving in war and peace

Commanders
- OC 1969-1973: Commandant R.D.J. Coetzee
- OC 1973-1983: Commandant L. Human
- OC 1983-1988: Commandant P.J. Viljoen
- OC 1988-1991: Commandant P.J. Roetz
- OC 1991-1997: Lt Colonel J.C. Zelie

Insignia
- Collar Badge: Bursting grenade with seven flames
- Beret Colour: Oxford Blue
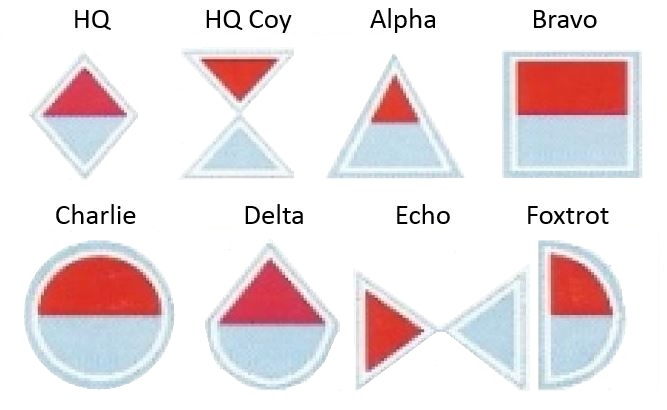
- Battery emblems

- Beret bar c. 1992

Regiment Overvaal is a reserve force regiment of the South African Army Air Defence Artillery Formation.

== History ==
=== Origin ===
8 Light Anti-Aircraft (8 LAA) was established in 1969 as a Medium Light Anti-Aircraft Regiment and was based on the Vereeniging Military Base. The unit was established without any troops. P Battery of Regiment Vaalrivier was therefore subsequently transferred on 1 October 1969 to form 8 LAA.

SADF era 8 LLA shoulder title

=== Organisation ===
The first Officer Commanding was Commandant R.D.J. Coetzee and the first RSM WO1 C.S. Feldtmann.

Major R.D.J. Coetzee was appointed as the acting Commanding Officer on formation of the unit and was accompanied by 420 members consisting of:

- 11 officers (2 majors, 1 captain, 3 lieutenants and 5 second lieutenants)
- 40 NCOs (1 WO2, 6 sergeants, 22 bombardiers and 11 lance-bombardiers)
- 369 Gunners

=== Renamed ===
8 LAA was renamed on 27 April 1973 as Regiment Overvaal.

=== Higher HQ ===
Regiment Overvaal fell under the regional jurisdiction of Witwatersrand Command from 1969 to 1974.

=== Divisional Command ===
Regiment Overvaal was assigned to support 8th Armoured Division from 1974 to 1984.

Regiment Overvaal then was assigned to Far Northern Command from 1984 to 1987.

The regiment was finally returned to 8th Armoured Division from 1987 to 1997.

=== Freedom of Entry ===
The Regiment was awarded the Right and Privilege of Freedom of Entry into Vereeniging on the 6 September 1986 with Commandant. P.J. Viljoen accepting that honour. This Freedom was exercised in the 15 September 1990 with Commandant. P.J.Roetz commanding.

=== Equipment ===
Regiment Overvaal is a unit which executes the Anti-Aircraft task independently, or in support of other arms using radar controlled Oerlikon GDF guns. These cannon can be used in all-weather conditions against low flying aircraft and can, if necessary be used in a ground role as well.

=== Operational Service ===
- Ops Savannah 1976 (SWA)
- Sector 10 – 1979/1980/1981 (SWA)
- Sector 10 – 1983/1984 (SWA)
- Ops Pebble – 1984/1985/1986 (Soutpansberg Military Area – Far North Command)
- Ops Hilti – 1988 (81 Brigade - (SWA))
- Ops Eardrum – 1990 (Pietermaritzburg – Natal Command)
- Ops Jambu – 1994 (eShowe – Natal Command)

=== Riot Control ===
Mamelodi, Shoshanguwe and KwaNdebele - 1987/1988

== Insignia ==
=== Previous Insignia ===
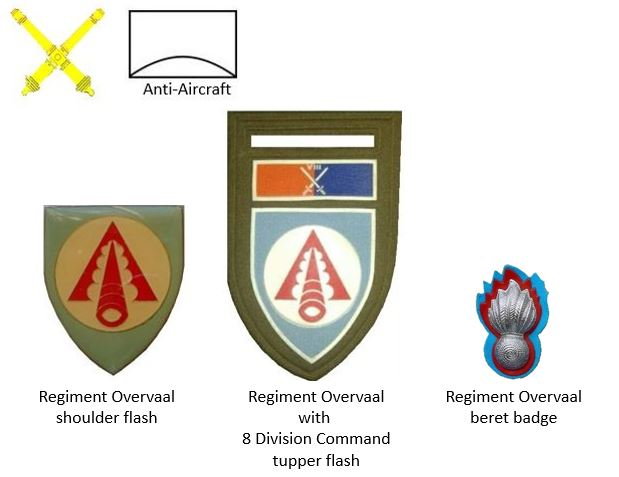
SADF era Regiment Overvaal insignia

== Leadership ==
Regiment Overvaal Leadership
From	Commanding Officers	To	Ribbon
1969	Cmdt R.D.J. Coetzee JCD	1973	John Chard Decoration JCD
1973	Cmdt L. Human MMM,JCD	1983	Military Merit Medal MMM John Chard Decoration JCD
1983	Cmdt P.J. Viljoen MMM,JCD	1988	Military Merit Medal MMM John Chard Decoration JCD
1988	Cmdt P.J. Roetz MMM,JCD	1991	Military Merit Medal MMM John Chard Decoration JCD
1991	Lt Col J.C. Zelie MMM	1997	Military Merit Medal MMM
From	Regimental Sergeants Major	To	Ribbon
1969	WO1 C.S. Feldtmann MMM	1984	Military Merit Medal MMM
1984	WO1 G.D.J. Beukes MMM,JCD	1988	Military Merit Medal MMM John Chard Decoration JCD
1988	WO1 F.J. du Plooy MMM	1991	Military Merit Medal MMM
1991	WO1 J.J.G. Greyling JCD	1994	John Chard Decoration JCD
1994	WO1 J. Klonarides JCD	1997	John Chard Decoration JCD
From	Chaplains	To	Ribbon
nd	Unknown	nd	
