= Sector 10 =

Sector 10 ১০ নং সেক্টর VIP Sector
- Sector
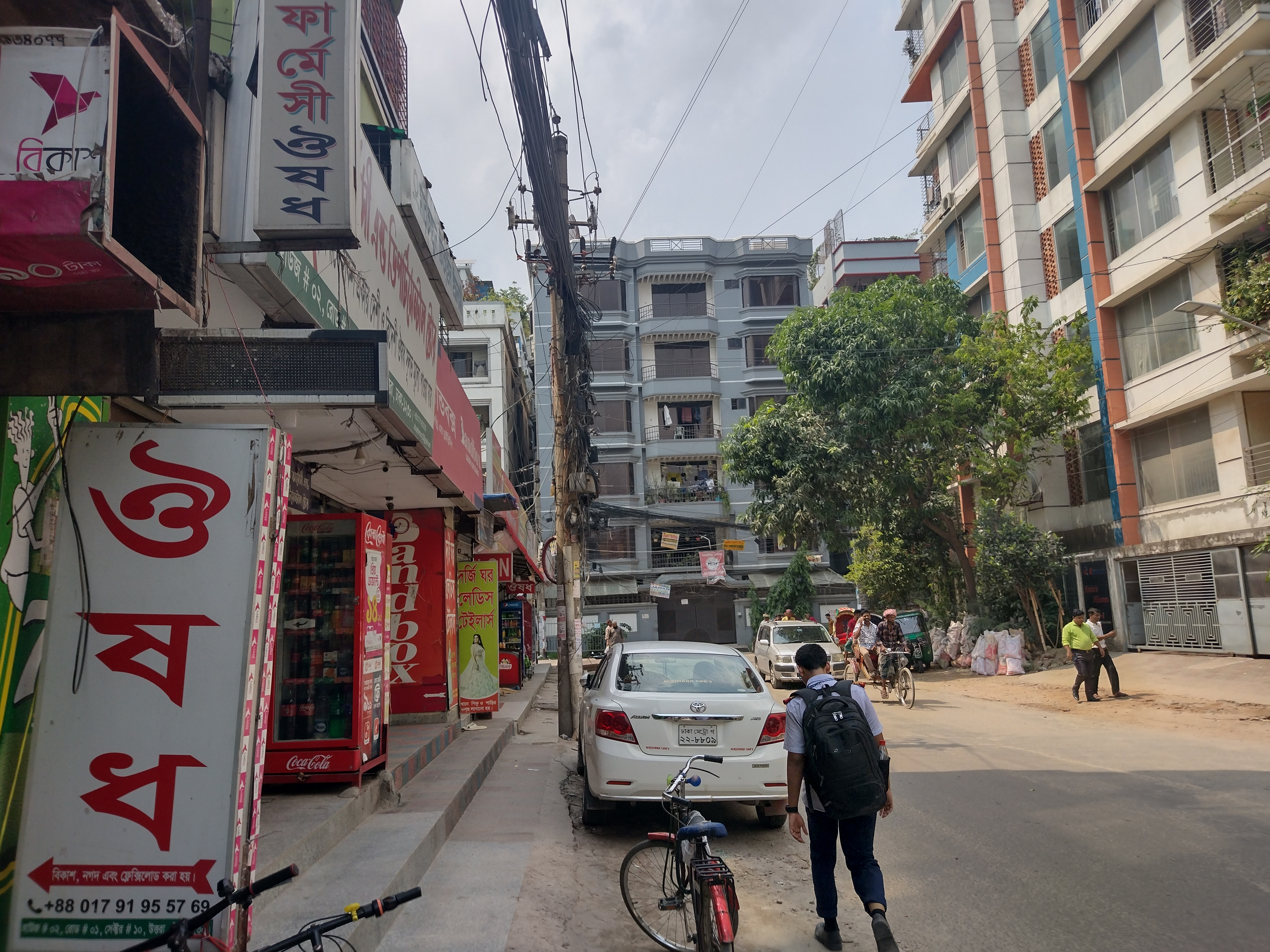
- Road 1, Sector 10
- Nickname: No. 10
- Interactive map of Sector 10
- Coordinates: 23.8858181°N 90.3895417°E
- Country: Bangladesh
- City: Dhaka
- Neighbourhood: Uttara
- Established: 1990
- Founder: Rajdhani Unnayan Kartripakkha

Government
  - Type: City Corporation
  - Body: Dhaka North

Sector 10, also known as the VIP Sector, is an area and residential sector in Uttara, Dhaka, Bangladesh. It is the largest administrative sector in the neighbourhood with more than 3000 plots.

It was developed as a planned community and its plots were leased for residents in 1990. All the plots in this sector planned by Rajdhani Unnayan Kartripakkha were transferred to the leaseholders in 1997. As of 2016, it was facing the issue of shortage of water supply to its residences. Most of its streets are in a state of disrepair and have become almost unusable. Slums were established in the vacant areas from the locality's 13th Road through Ranabhola Avenue up to Bhatulia, whose residents have been blamed for criminal activities in the area. The locality also contains two Bede settlements. There is a central mosque in the sector which was the reason of a controversy in 2019 after the mosque authority restricted the mosque for children. As of 2022, even though it is a residential community, its plots are used for commercial purposes which is illegal. In 2023, local residents formed a human chain in protest against the attempt to rebuild a newly demolished dumping station in the area.
