= 10 Anti-Aircraft Regiment =

Military unit of the South African Army

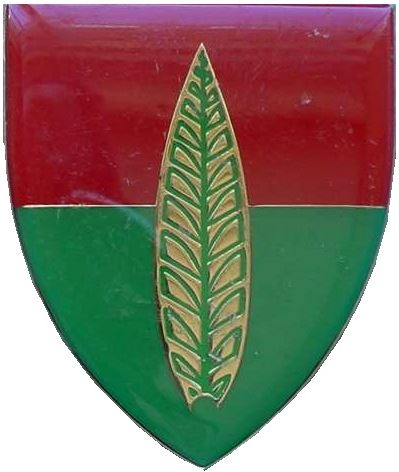
- 10 Anti-Aircraft Regiment emblem
- Active: 1 February 1968 -
- Country: South Africa
- Allegiance: Republic of South Africa; Republic of South Africa
- Branch: South African Army; South African Army
- Type: Anti-aircraft artillery
- Part of: South African Army Air Defence Artillery Formation; Army Conventional Reserve
- Garrison/HQ: Kimberley

Insignia
- Collar Badge: Bursting grenade with seven flames
- Beret Colour: Oxford Blue
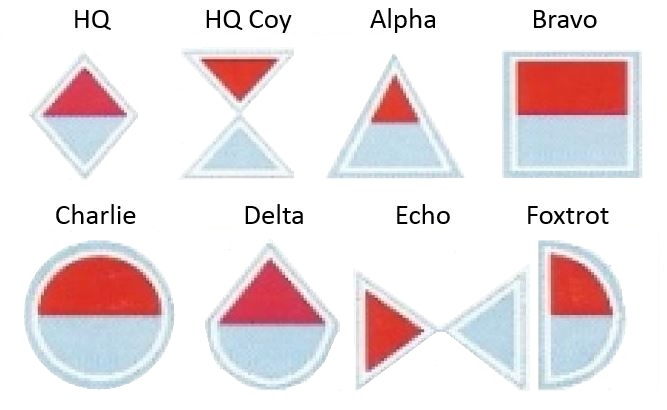
- Battery emblems

- Beret bar circa 1992

10 Anti-Aircraft Regiment is an anti-aircraft artillery regiment of the South African Army.

== History ==
=== Origin ===
10 Anti-Aircraft Regiment was formally established on 1 February 1968 as though it was a new unit of the Permanent Force, without any mention of the fact that it was obviously a reconstruction of 10 Anti-Aircraft Battery.

Its headquarters was at Youngsfield in Cape Town, where the Artillery Air Defence School had been established from the same date.

=== Incidents ===
13 October 2007: An Oerlikon GDF Mk.5 35 mm anti-aircraft twin-barrelled gun malfunctioned, spraying hundreds of high-explosive 0,5 kg 35mm cannon shells around the five-gun firing position. By the time the gun had emptied its dual 250-round magazines, nine soldiers were dead and eleven injured. The accident occurred just before 9 am, when a battery from 10 Anti-Aircraft Regiment began a live-fire exercise at the Army Combat Training Centre at Lohatlha as part of the SANDF's Exercise Seboka.

=== Starstreak missile development ===
10 AA Regiment participated in the first live firing of Starstreak missiles on African soil. This firing took place at the Denel Overberg Test Range.

On 24 September 2020, General Officer Commanding Interim Provincial Command KwaZulu-Natal, Brigadier General Siphiwo Dlomo, visited the incoming Bravo Company of 10 Anti-Aircraft Regiment at Ndumo, where it was arriving to take part in South African National Defence Force operations in support of the SA Government response to the COVID-19 pandemic in South Africa. The purpose of the visit was to welcome the company and to consider command and control aspects as the unit is co-located with other Operation NOTLELA elements.

== Role ==
10 Anti-Aircraft Regiment provides ground-based air defence for the South African Army.

In the draft South African Army Vision 2020 force design, the 2007 organograms published with Leon Engelbrecht's unpublished manuscript A Guide to the SANDF chart the regiment as the mechanised air defence regiment of the Armoured Brigade (Free State) within the Mechanised Division (headquarters Wallmansthal).

== Equipment ==
Historical

10 Anti-Aircraft Regiment has used the following equipment throughout its history:

- 40mm Bofors,
- 3.7 inch heavy AA gun
- GA1-CO1 20mm light gun
- GDF-002 twin 35mm automatic gun with Super Fledermaus fire control system
- ZU-23-2 twin 23mm and
- 20/3 M55 A2 anti-aircraft guns

Current

- GDF-005 twin 35mm gun with the Skyshield fire control system
- Starstreak ground-to-air missile

== Insignia ==
=== Previous Dress Insignia ===
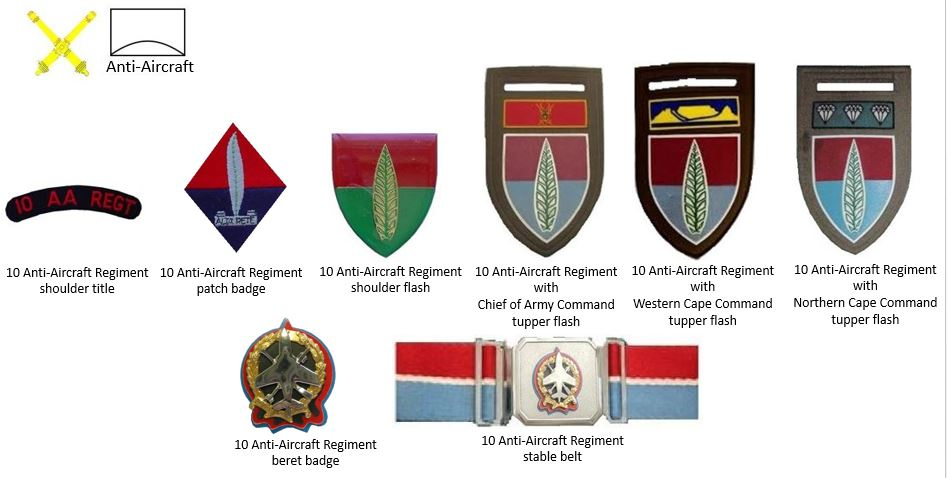
SADF era 10 Anti Aircraft Regiment insignia
