= S. M. Sazzat Ali =

Bangladeshi police officer (born 1961)

- এস. এম. সাজ্জাত আলী
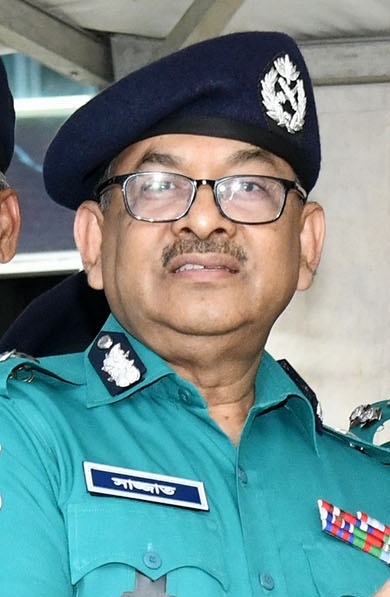
- Ali in 2025

37th Police Commissioner of Dhaka Metropolitan Police
- In office 20 November 2024 – 25 February 2026
- Appointed by: Minister of Home Affairs
- Preceded by: Md. Mainul Hasan
- Succeeded by: Md. Sarwar

Personal details
- Born: Sheikh Mohammad Sazzat Ali; March 25, 1961 (age 65) Dhaka District, East Pakistan, Pakistan
- Education: University of Dhaka
- Awards: Bangladesh Police Medal - Service
- Police career
- Allegiance: Bangladesh
- Branch: Bangladesh Police
- Service years: 1986–2026
- Status: Retired
- Rank: Special IGP

S. M. Sazzat Ali, NDC (March 25, 1961) is a retired officer of the Bangladesh Police who was the 37th commissioner of the Dhaka Metropolitan Police.

== Early life and education ==
S. M. Sazzat Ali was born into a Muslim family in Dhaka District. He obtained a Bachelor of Social Sciences (BSS) and a Master of Social Sciences (MSS), as well as an LLB degree, from the University of Dhaka.

== Career ==
He joined Bangladesh Police as assistant superintendent in 1984 through the 6th BCS. He served in metropolitan police, ranges, various districts, and units with professionalism and distinction.

Ali held the post of commissioner of the Khulna Metropolitan Police in 2004. He also served as superintendent of police in Luxmipur, Bagerhat, Narail, and parts of Dhaka Metropolitan Police.

Other major roles included deputy inspector general (DIG) of Chattogram Range, Dhaka Range, and Police Headquarters, as well as principal of the Bangladesh Police Academy, Sardah. He also served in CID's Detective Training School and as additional IGP at the Police Headquarters.

He participated in several international trainings, such as the Officers Survival Course and Senior Crisis Management Course in the US, and a policy and administration program with the Japan Police. He completed the National Defense Course (NDC) in 2009. He served in UN peacekeeping missions in Cambodia (1993), Kosovo (2000), and Liberia (2005).

As per a government order dated 23 March 2025, Ali was retrospectively promoted to the rank of inspector general of police (IGP) from 12 January 2017.

He took charge as DMP commissioner on 21 November 2024, succeeding Md. Mainul Hasan. His appointment came on a contractual basis for two years after the fall of the Awami League-led government and the subsequent formation of a police reform commission. He is a recipient of the President Police Medal (PPM) in recognition of his courageous and skilled service.

== Notable contributions ==
On 13 January 2025, Sheikh Md. Sajjad Ali NDC introduced a directive to ensure quicker police response after filing a General Diary (GD). Under this policy, police must reach the location within one hour and begin a preliminary investigation.

== Personal life ==
He is married to Mrs. Rahena Sultana and has three kids.

== See also ==
- Bangladesh Police FC
