= Galeshewe Anti-Aircraft Regiment =

Regiment Vaalrivier Galeshewe Anti-Aircraft Regiment
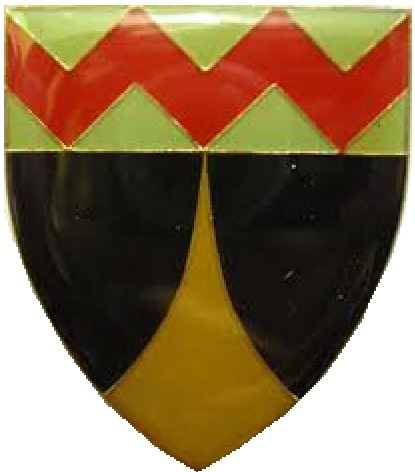
- SANDF Regiment Vaalriver emblem
- Active: 1 January 1960–
- Country: South Africa
- Allegiance: Republic of South Africa; Republic of South Africa
- Branch: South African Army; South African Army
- Type: Reserve Air Defence Artillery
- Part of: South African Army Air Defence Artillery Formation; Army Conventional Reserve
- Garrison/HQ: Vereeniging, Brakpan, Kimberly

Insignia
- Collar Badge: Bursting grenade with seven flames
- Beret Colour: Oxford Blue
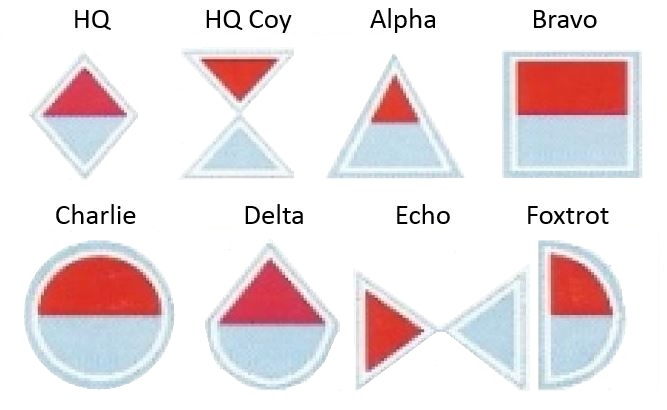
- Battery emblems

- Beret bar c. 1992
- Abbreviation: GAAR

Galeshewe Anti-Aircraft Regiment (formerly Regiment Vaalriver) is a reserve air defence artillery regiment of the South African Army.

== History ==
=== Origin ===
Regiment Vaalrivier was established on 1 January 1960 as one of the Afrikaans medium anti-aircraft units. The unit was headquartered in Vereeniging.

=== Border War ===
Regiment Vaalrivier provided air defence in the Border War from 1976 to 1984 as part of 7 South African Infantry Division.

=== Equipment and operations ===
Regiment Vaalrivier was initially armed with 35mm Oerlikon and 40mm Bofors units. By 1975, the regiment only had three 35mm batteries of 12 guns per battery.

Regiment Vaalrivier provided air defence artillery for the border war in 1976 to 1980, stationing batteries at Grootfontein, Rundu, Ondwanga, Ruacana and Oshakati and once again Ruacana in 1980.

By 1984 forward, the regiment was involved in cross border operations as well.

=== Amalgamation ===
In 1997 members of Regiment Overvaal were amalgamated into the Regiment.

=== Migration ===
Regiment Vaalrivier moved to Apex Base in Brakpan in 2008, but eventually was transferred to Kimberley.

=== Name Change ===
In August 2019, 52 Reserve Force units had their names changed to reflect the diverse military history of South Africa. Regiment Vaalriver became the Galeshewe Anti-Aircraft Regiment, and have 3 years to design and implement new regimental insignia.

== Regimental Symbols ==
=== Previous Dress Insignia ===
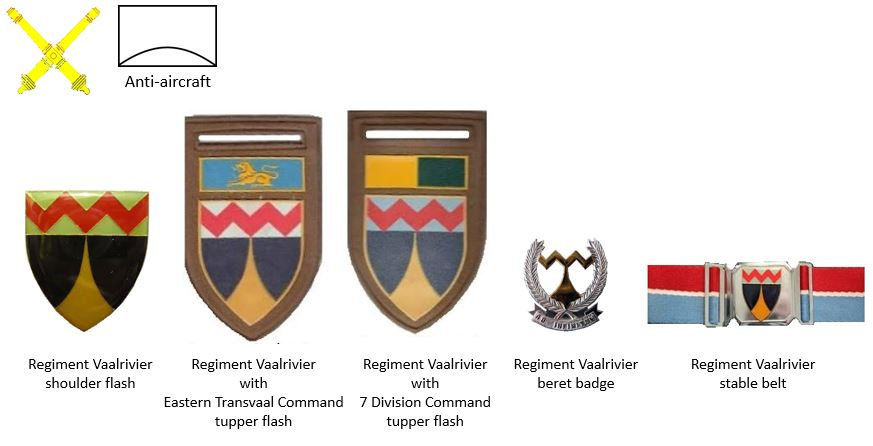
SADF era Regiment Vaalrivier insignia

== Battle honours ==
- Operation Savannah (Angola)

== Freedom of the City ==
Regiment Vaalrivier received the Freedom of Vereeniging on 27 April 1963 and the Freedom of Vanderbijlpark on 31 October 1970.
