= Air Defence Artillery School =

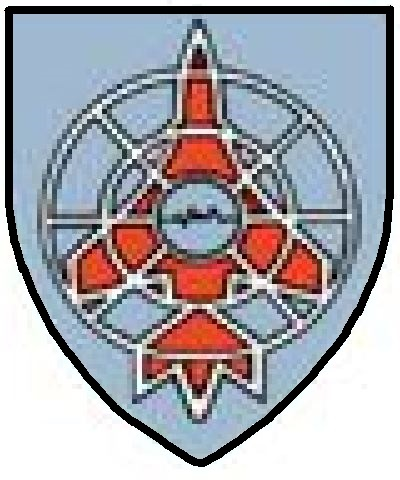
- SANDF Air Defence Artillery School emblem
- Active: 1955 - present
- Country: South Africa
- Allegiance: Republic of South Africa; Republic of South Africa
- Branch: South African Army; South African Army
- Type: Training Artillery
- Part of: South African Army Air Defence Artillery Formation
- Garrison/HQ: Kimberley
- Motto(s): ALTA PETE – Aim High

Insignia
- Collar Badge: Bursting grenade with seven flames
- Beret Colour: Oxford Blue
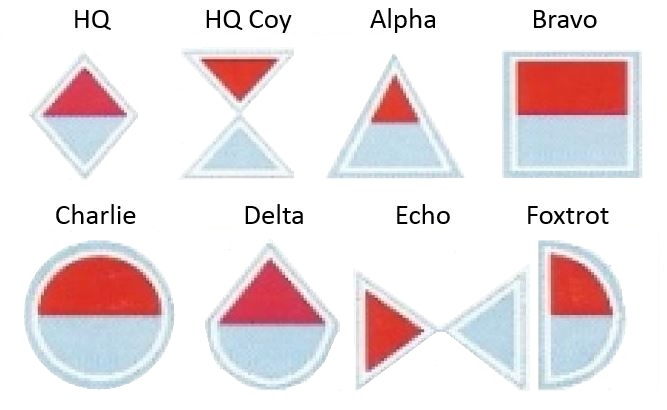
- Battery emblems

- Beret bar circa 1992

Air Defence Artillery School is an artillery unit of the South African Army. It is located on the southern side of Kimberley near the airport in an area known as Diskobolos clustered with other military units.

== History ==
=== Coastal Defence Origins ===
The first South African Air Defence Instructors were coastal gunners. The first formal training institution was the Anti-Aircraft Training and Reserve Depot, situated on Robben Island, under the command of the Director Coastal Artillery, which was established in May 1941.

This title changed in April 1942 and became the Coastal Artillery and Anti-Aircraft Training Department. The first Director, Lt Col S. Jeffrey, advised for a separate School for Anti-Aircraft Defence. He was successful in his request. At the same time the Anti-Aircraft Depot was also established.

=== Training ===
Training of Anti-Aircraft gunners was undertaken by the 3rd Anti-Aircraft Regiment at Pollsmoor. The School was established at the Forestry Departments camp at Ottery near a plantation called the Rifle Range which eventually housed 200 personnel.

A Searchlight School was also established at Port Elizabeth, but this was closed in August 1942. In November 1942, the Anti-Aircraft Training Centre consisted of an HQ, a AA Department and the School of AA Defence, which was assisted by officers, warrant officers and NCOs sent from Britain.

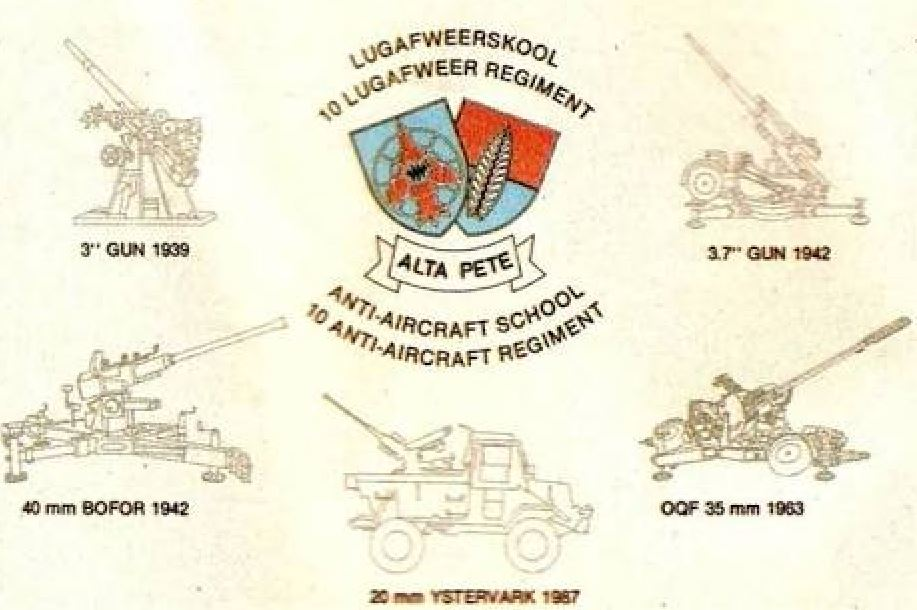
SADF ADA School weapons systems training over the years

=== Air Force connection ===
The Training Centre was transferred to the South African Air Force in January 1944 and converted to a Depot, but by 1945, the training centre closed.

=== Revival ===
The Anti-Aircraft Training Centre was revived as a unit in October 1955, with its headquarters in Youngsfield, but this was replaced by the Artillery Air Defence School, one year later.

The unit was transferred to Kimberly in 1990 under command of Col S.K. Warren.

== Insignia ==
=== Previous Dress Insignia ===
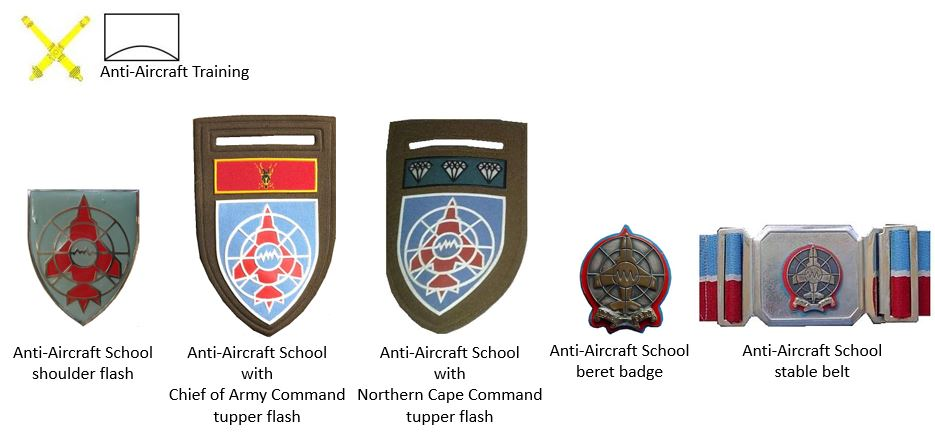
SADF era Anti Aircraft School insignia

== Freedom of the City ==
The school has received several freedoms of the city, mainly for its assistance in disaster relief:

- Wolesley 1975
- Cape Town 1980
- Tulbagh 1983
- Touws River 1987
