= Md. Mainul Hasan =

Bangladeshi police officer (born 1968)

Muhammad Mainul Hasan
- মোঃ মাইনুল হাসান
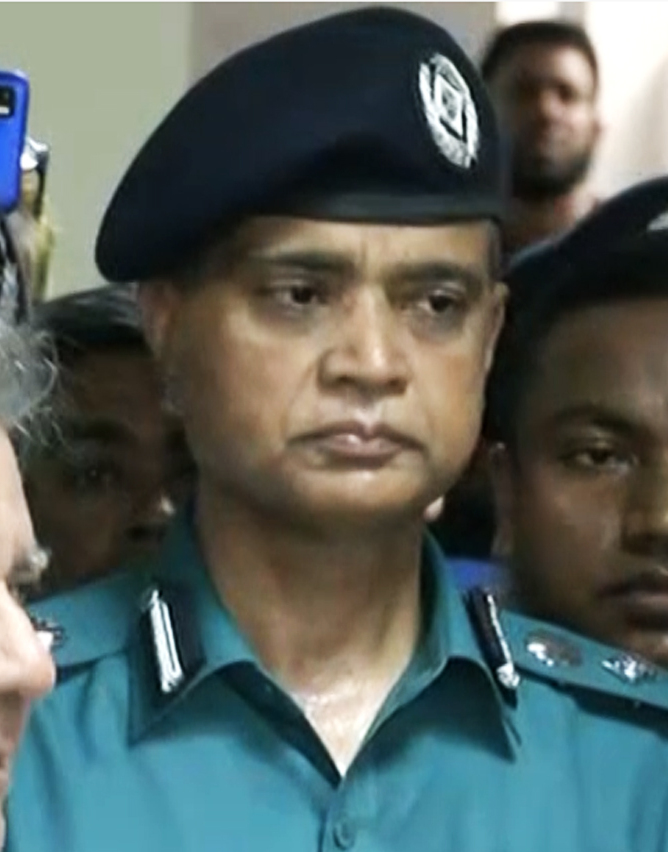
- Hasan in 2024

Chief of Tourist Police
- Incumbent
- Assumed office 7 December 2024
- President: Mohammed Shahabuddin
- Prime Minister: Muhammad Yunus (acting)
- Preceded by: Md. Abu Kalam Siddique

36th Police Commissioner of Dhaka Metropolitan Police
- In office 8 August 2024 – 20 November 2024
- Appointed by: Minister of Home Affairs
- Preceded by: Habibur Rahman
- Succeeded by: Sheikh Sajjad Ali

Personal details
- Born: 1 December 1968 (age 57) Kishoreganj, East Pakistan, Pakistan
- Education: Bangladesh Police Academy
- Awards: BPM (Bar)
- Police career
- Allegiance: Bangladesh
- Branch: Bangladesh Police
- Status: Active
- Rank: Additional IGP

Muhammad Mainul Hasan (born 1 December 1968) is a Bangladeshi police officer. He was the 36th commissioner of the DMP. Before that, he was deputy inspector general of the Criminal Investigation Department. Currently he is an additional inspector general of the Tourist Police.

== Early life ==
Hasan obtained his master's in physics from Chittagong University. He also did his LLB and LLM at South East University.

== Career ==
Through the 17th BCS, Hasan became an assistant superintendent of police with the Bangladesh Police.

Hasan served at SSF as assistant director, additional superintendent of police Narsingdi, and ADC (Traffic DMP). As a police superintendent, he served SS (SB). He worked as deputy commissioner DB, discipline, MT, and traffic at Dhaka Metropolitan Police, Dhaka.

Being an additional deputy inspector general, Hasan also served as additional police commissioner, Chittagong Metropolitan Police (CMP); and additional police commissioner, Sylhet Metropolitan Police (SMP). Later he served as additional DIG at the Police Bureau of Investigation (PBI) Headquarters, Dhaka. After being promoted to the rank of DIG, he served at CID headquarters, Dhaka.

== Personal life ==
He is married and the father of two sons.
