= South African Army Air Defence Artillery Formation =

South African Air Defence Artillery Formation
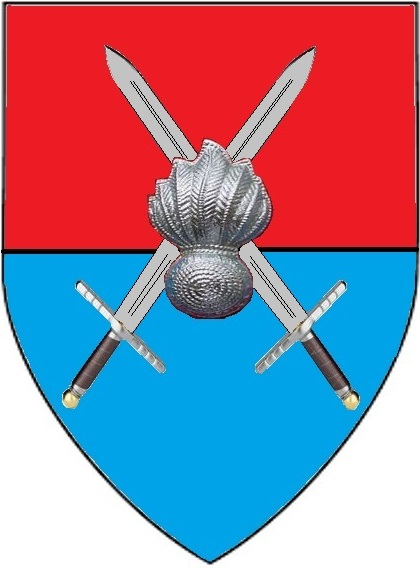
- SANDF Air Defence Artillery Formation emblem
- Active: 1999 to date
- Country: South Africa
- Allegiance: South African Army
- Branch: South African Army
- Type: Air Defense Artillery
- Part of: South African Army
- Colors: Turquoise and scarlet

Commanders
- General Officer Commanding (GOC): Brig Gen G.S. Hlongwa
- General of the Gunners: Maj Gen Roy Andersen CSSA SD SM MMM JCD JCD with 30 Yr Clasp

Insignia
- Collar Badge: Bursting grenade with seven flames
- Beret Colour: Oxford Blue
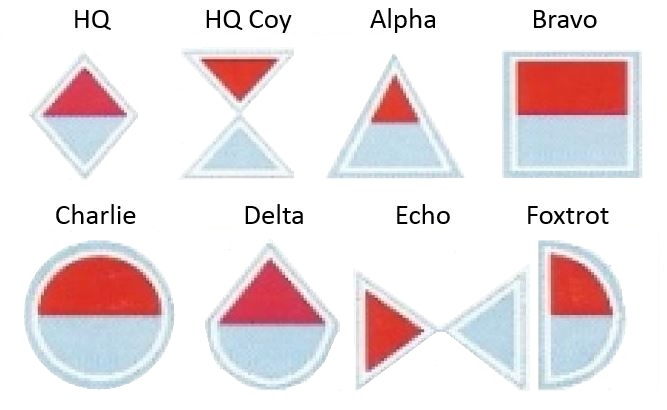
- Battery emblems

- Beret bar circa 1992

The South African Army Air Defence Artillery Formation is the controlling entity of all South African Army Air Defence Artillery units. This Formation consists of both regular and reserve units.

== History ==
=== Origin, World War 2 and the Bushwar ===
Air Defence Artillery in South Africa dates back to 1 April 1939 when the 1st Anti-Aircraft Battery was established as part of the Coast Artillery Brigade. The first anti-aircraft training took place at Brooklyn airfield and at Klaasjagersberg, near Cape Point, in 1939. The 1st Anti-Aircraft Battery departed for active service in East Africa in 1940, and during the Second World War, gunners of Anti-Aircraft units won the respect of both friend and foe with their courageous actions.

From the first Anti-Aircraft unit in 1939, Cape Town was no doubt the home of the Anti-Aircraft gunner. On 1 January 1962 the wartime concept of a training regiment was realised with the establishment of 10 Anti-Aircraft Battery. This was the forerunner of 10 Anti-Aircraft Regiment, which was established on 1 February 1968 together with the Artillery Air Defence School (AADS) in place of the Anti-Aircraft Training Centre. These two units amalgamated on 1 November 1969 and were designated Artillery Air Defence School/10 Anti-Aircraft Regiment. The name was changed in 1984 to Anti-Aircraft School/10 Anti-Aircraft Regiment.

It became increasingly more evident that the Anti-Aircraft School/10 Anti-Aircraft Regiment, being situated at the southernmost centre of South Africa, lost out on valuable experience by not being able to regularly participate in integrated training with other South African Defence force fighting units. It was then decided to move the unit to Kimberley, and at the end of 1990, the whole unit with its personnel and equipment moved to Kimberley.

=== Air Defence Artillery in the SANDF after 1994 ===
The Army's reorganisation after the creation of the new South African National Defence Force, was lengthy. Corps were restructured with Regular and Reserve Regiments under command. The so-called “Type Formations” were established which assumed responsibility for the provisioning of combat-ready forces to be employed under the direction of Joint Operations Division.

In 1997, the 7th Light Anti-Aircraft Regiment, active since the 1960s, was disestablished. Regiment Overvaal (ROV) was established on 1 April 1969 as an Afrikaans Anti-Aircraft Regiment based on Vereeniging Military Base in Vereeniging. P Battery of Regiment Vaalrivier was transferred on 1 October 1969 to form 8th Light Anti-Aircraft Regiment (8LLA). The name changed from 8LLA to ROV on 27 April 1993. The regiment was disestablished in 1997.

The South African Gunner publication states that during 1999, the Directorate Anti-Aircraft became the South African Air Defence Artillery Formation, with a colonel as officer commanding. Later a Brigadier General was appointed as the General Officer Commanding of two Regular Force units and four Reserve units. The SA ADA Formation was founded on January 1, 1999, and it had the South African Air Force's Air Defence Artillery Group, previously mainly responsible for airfield air defense (including 120 Squadron SAAF and 121 Squadron SAAF), disbanded and centralized within it. Equipment was transferred to the new Formation.

=== Further reorganisation ===
In 2001, as part of the South African Army's transformation process, the Anti-Aircraft School/10 Anti-Aircraft Regiment were split into two units, namely Anti-Aircraft School, renamed the Air Defence Artillery School and 10 Anti-Aircraft Regiment. This happened under the leadership of Colonel C.R. Lindsay and Warrant Officer Class 1 (RSM) P.A. Kruger.

With effect from 1 January 2015, Col G.S. Hlongwa was promoted to the rank of Brigadier General in the post of GOC ADA Formation, taking over from Brig Gen Mbuli who has been promoted to Maj Gen and appointed to the post of Chief Director Defense Acquisition Material.

In 2014, it was reported that a history of air defence in South Africa was in the process of being compiled. This history was to be authored by Colonel (Rtd) Lionel Crook in conjunction with the SA Army Reserves and the SA ADA Formation. It was estimated that this history will take three years to compile.

=== Recent deployments ===
Due to a shortage of regular infantry, both 4 Artillery Regiment and 10 Air Defence Regiment have recently provided gunners deployed in a secondary role as line infantry in the central African region on peacekeeping duties. 10 Anti-Aircraft Regiment also provided three Batteries for external deployment in Burundi. The first Battery deployed was 102 Battery under command of Major L. Puckree. After 6 months, 101 Battery relieved them in Burundi under the command of Major S.G. Hlongwa. 103 Battery relieved 101 Battery in Burundi. After 18 months of external deployment the Regiment went back to its normal activities.

January 1999, different batteries within the Air Defence Artillery were deployed at Macadamia in Mpumalanga, Lesotho border and KwaZulu Natal.

In 2006, Air Defence Artillery sent two Batteries to Pondrift on the Zimbabwe border for patrols.

In July 2011, a radar unit from 10th Anti-Aircraft Regiment was deployed to Juba, South Sudan to support the South African Air Force's airspace management and air traffic control mission during that country's independence celebrations.

== Air Defence Units ==
The IISS Military Balance 2020 says South Africa has a single active air defence artillery regiment, and five reserve regiments (p.501). The SA Air Defence Artillery was listed with six regiments circa 2010.

There is one active air defence regiment, 10 Anti-Aircraft Regiment, the school, and five reserve regiments.

The Anti-Aircraft Training Centre was appointed and established as a unit of the Permanent Force on 1 October 1955, but became the Air Defence Artillery School in February 1968.

10 Anti-Aircraft Regiment (Kimberley) was established as 10 Anti-Aircraft Battery SAA (AA) with effect 1 January 1962 as a unit of the Permanent Force. Headquarters was at Young’s Field and it was under the command of Maj DDG Steenkamp. From 1 February 1968 it became 10 Anti-Aircraft Regiment. From the beginning it was not possible, owing to the acute shortage of personnel, to run the two units separately. Consequently, 10 Anti-Aircraft Regiment was tasked with the administration of the School. A partial solution was the amalgamation of the two units under the title: Artillery Air Defence School/10 Anti-Aircraft Regiment. The regiment transferred to Kimberley at the end of 1990. The “marriage” with AADS came to an end on 31 March 1999 when the two units again became independent entities.

=== Reserve units ===
- Autshumato Anti-Aircraft Regiment, Cape Town; previously named the Cape Garrison Artillery until August 2019
- Galeshewe Anti-Aircraft Regiment (GAAR), established 1 January 1960 as Regiment Vaalrivier, at Vereeniging, and which kept that name until 2019;
- IWombe Anti-Aircraft Regiment, Benoni, previously named the Regiment Oos Transvaal until 2019
- Sekhukhune Anti-Aircraft Regiment
- Madzhakandila Anti-Aircraft Regiment (Pretoria) - created 1985. 44 Anti-Aircraft Regiment was established as a unit of the Citizen Force from January 1985 with its headquarters at Hammanskraal. (Murrayhill near Wallmansthal, some 35 kilometres (22 mi) north of Pretoria). The unit struggled to obtain any National Service intake as personnel posted to 44 Parachute Brigade were being passed to the battalions and were not being released for the AA unit.

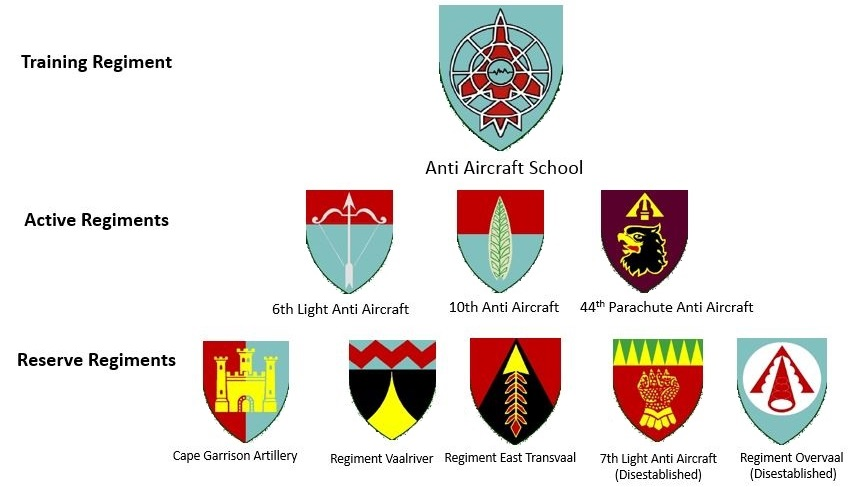

== Equipment ==
The Formation uses the following equipment, among others:

Variant	Origin/Design	Comment	Image
Starstreak portable missile	United Kingdom	Man Portable Ground to Air missile	A Starstreak emplacement, one of the 3 missiles has already been fired
Ystervark Oerlikon Anti-Aircraft Platform	Switzerland South Africa	20mm single cannon, optically aimed GA1-CO1 and GA1-B01, decommissioned	Ystervark single 20mm cannon platform
Oerlikon Anti-Aircraft	Switzerland	35mm twin autocannons, battery capable, radar controlled	SANDF Oerlikon 35mm cannon
Bosvark Anti-Aircraft	Soviet Union South Africa	ZU 23mm twin autocannons on Kwevoel chassis	Bosvark ZU23 Anti aircraft
LPD20 Field Radar	Italy	Off-road trailer	SANDF LPD20 field radar
Contraves Superfledermaus	Switzerland	Off-road trailer, fire control omnidirectional pulse radar device, simultaneously for two Oerlikon 35mm guns	SANDF Superfledermaus
Thutlwa Radar Platform	South Africa	SHE Cavallo Truck chassis	SANDF Thutlwa radar platform

=== ESR 220 Thutlwa Radar development ===
Four Thutlwa systems were ordered in 1996 under Project Bioskoop and delivered by 2006. The Thutlwa is a highly mobile solid state L-band 2D surveillance radar designed to provide early warning to air defence artillery troops in the field. It is a fully autonomous armoured system with self-contained power plant packaged on a Spanish-designed Kynos Aljaba 8x8 (“Skimmel” in SANDF parlance) truck, and is capable of being fully operational within 10 minutes of arrival at the deployment site.

The system built by Reutech also provides for a combined air picture derived from primary radar and IFF (identification, friend or foe), as well as a command and control system for effective air defence control. The high mobility nature of the system, which is transported on an all-terrain 8x8 transporter, coupled to the battlefield-specific local warning sensor design, make the system a pivotal element of the South African Army Ground-based Air Defence System. It is said to be able to track up to 100 targets simultaneously to a range of 120 km. The mast is 12m tall.

=== Anti-aircraft cannon upgrades ===
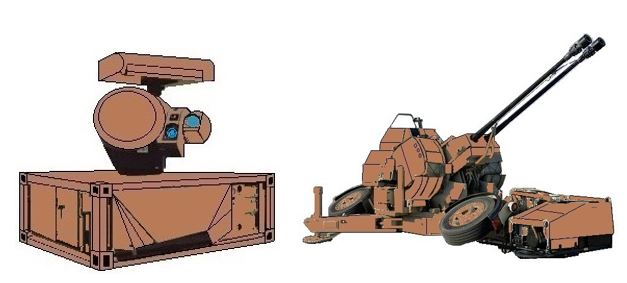
Oerlikon Skyshield upgrade

The SANDF acquired 169 Oerlikon GDF 35mm guns, along with 75 Superfledermaus fire control units (FCUs) in 1963. In 1990, 48 of these Mark (Mk) I guns were upgraded to Mk V status and the Superfledermaus fire control units were replaced by Italian LPD20 radars.

German defence company Rheinmetall AG will be responsible for the modernisation of this system, which will include logistics and training services scheduled for completion by 2017. The company is represented in South Africa by Rheinmetall Denel Munitions, with State owned Denel, a 49% shareholder. The contract will see Oerlikon Skyshield fire control systems being supplied. A number of these guns will be retrofitted with upgrade kits to accommodate Rheinmetall’s state-of-the-art Ahead airburst ammunition. The Skyshield technology will enable the SANDF to protect sensitive installations such as the Houses of Parliament, power plants, stadiums and other critical and civilian assets from a wide array of aerial threats, including asymmetric terrorist-type attacks. Skyshield air defence systems can be easily transported and can be deployed anywhere, depending on an evolving threat situation.

=== Future acquisitions ===
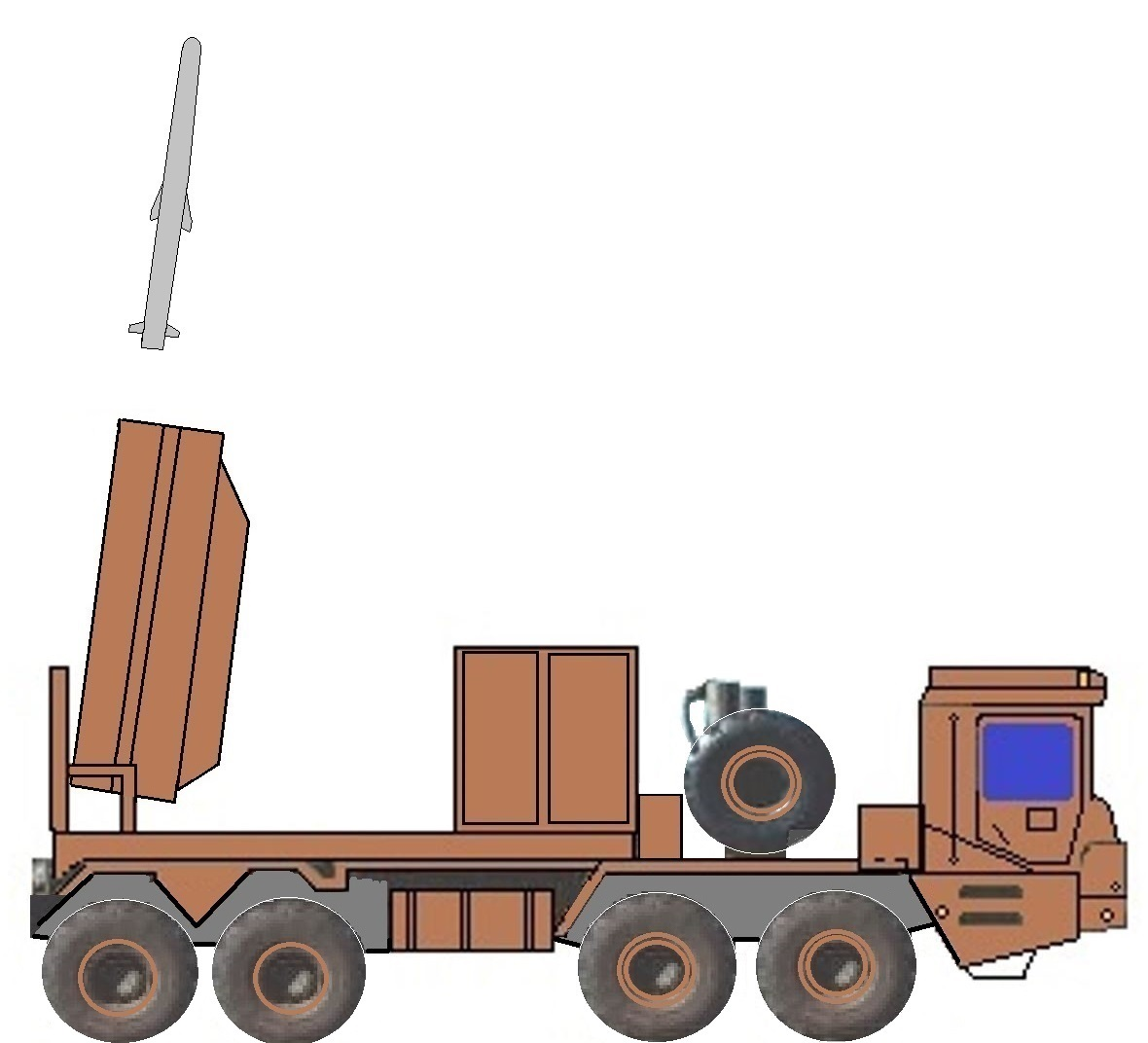
Umkhonto GBAD on She Carvello platform

South African made mobile Umkhonto short-range surface-to-air missile system (A naval version is already in service with the South African Navy and Finnish Navy). Intended to be carried on a SHE Cavallo truck platform.
