= Syed Nurul Islam =

Bangladeshi police officer

- সৈয়দ নুরুল ইসলাম
- Born: 1 March 1971 (age 55); Chapainawabganj District, East Pakistan, Pakistan
- Education: University of Dhaka
- Office: Dhaka Range, Bangladesh Police
- Police career
- Branch: Bangladesh Police
- Status: Retired
- Rank: DIG
- Awards: BPM (bar); PPM

Syed Nurul Islam is a former deputy inspector general of the Bangladesh Police and former in charge of Dhaka Range. He is the former deputy commissioner of the Motijheel Division of the Dhaka Metropolitan Police. He was the additional deputy commissioner of Ramna Division.

Islam is the former superintendent of police of Mymensingh District. He is the former police superintendent of Comilla District. He is the former superintendent of police of Narayanganj District.

== Early life ==
Islam was born in Chapai Nawabganj District. He was the president of the AF Rahman Hall unit of Bangladesh Chhatra League while studying at the University of Dhaka.

== Career ==
In January 2010, Islam stopped a bus robbery along with his bodyguard and driver after he heard passengers screaming from the bus in Dhaka near Asad Gate. In 2011, he was awarded the President Police Medal. He was elected joint secretary of the Bangladesh Police Service Association. He was promoted to superintendent of police in April 2012.

In December 2012, Islam arrested Bhola District Judge Javed Imam with Phensedyl, an illicit cough syrup. Metropolitan Magistrate MA Salam of Dhaka Judges Court summoned Islam and four other police officers for presenting Javed Imam to the media. Justices AHM Shamsuddin Choudhury Manik and Farid Ahmed of the Bangladesh High Court ordered Islam's withdrawal.

Islam, then the deputy commissioner of the Ramna Zone of the Dhaka Metropolitan Police, blocked all traffic on roads to the University of Dhaka after students vandalized vehicles following the death of a fellow student in a road accident.

In January 2013, Islam was appointed superintendent of police of Narayanganj District. In June 2013, the Bangladesh High Court asked Islam why the Tanvir Mohammad Toki murder case should not be transferred to Rapid Action Battalion from Narayanganj Police. Islam was transferred out of the post of superintendent of police of Narayanganj District after the Seven Murders of the Narayanganj in April 2014 and was criticized for his role. He was interrogated by a probe body led by Shahjahan Ali Mollah. He had protected Jannatul Ferdous Nil, ward councilor of Narayanganj City Corporation, in a murder case and transferred the investigation officer of the case.

Islam, deputy commissioner of the Wari Division of the Dhaka Metropolitan Police, was included in an investigation committee led by additional deputy commissioner (crimes and ops) Mainul Hoque of the Dhaka Metropolitan Police Commission in January 2016. The committee was formed to investigate the assault of Dhaka South City Corporation employee Bikash Chandra Das by Jatrabari Police Station sub-inspector Arshadul Islam Akash. In July 2016, he was appointed superintendent of police of Mymensingh District.

Islam, superintendent of police of Mymensingh District, apologized to the International Crimes Tribunal-1 in February 2017. He had been accused of negligence of duty for failure to inform the tribunal that Wazuddin, fugitive accused of war crimes, had died, leading to a posthumous conviction. This was despite Islam having been informed by the Phulbaria police officer-in-charge of the death months before the verdict.

In May 2022, Islam was promoted to deputy inspector general. On 23 October 2022, Islam was appointed the deputy inspector general of Dhaka Range, replacing Habibur Rahman, who was appointed head of the tourist police.

Islam paid tribute to Sheikh Mujibur Rahman at his mausoleum in Tungipara after his appointment to the post of DIG. In December 2023, he was part of the Bangladesh Police operation to detain five thousand activists of the opposition Bangladesh Nationalist Party.

== Personal life ==
Islam's brother, Syed Nazrul Islam, sought the nomination of Awami League for Chapainawabganj-1 in the national election in 2023 and resigned from the post of upazila chairman. His other brother, Syed Monirul Islam, is the mayor of Shibganj.

== Controversies ==
He developed a faction within the Chapainawabganj District Awami League known as the SP (superintendent of police) League. Muhammad Nurul Huda, former inspector general of Bangladesh Police, called for action against Islam for violating norms of government service by being involved in politics. Mr. Islam, along with other controversial police officers who have been accused of giving orders to indiscriminately shoot during the student-led mass uprising in July and August, is now unaccounted for. Reports suggest that these officers managed to leave the country by manipulating the police administration.
