= IWombe Anti-Aircraft Regiment =

Regiment Oos Transvaal iWombe Anti-Aircraft Regiment
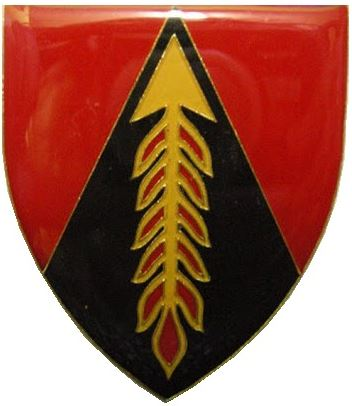
- SANDF Regiment Oos Transvaal emblem
- Active: 1 October 1964 -
- Country: South Africa
- Allegiance: Republic of South Africa; Republic of South Africa
- Branch: South African Army; South African Army
- Type: Reserve Artillery
- Part of: South African Army Air Defence Artillery Formation; Army Conventional Reserve
- Garrison/HQ: Benoni
- Battle honours: SE Angola

Insignia
- Collar Badge: Bursting grenade with seven flames
- Beret Colour: Oxford Blue
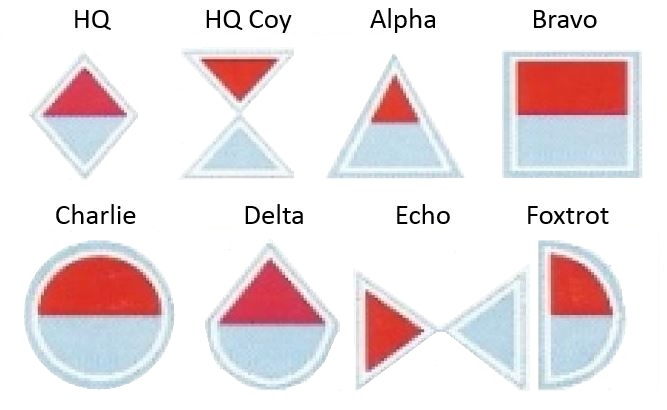
- Battery emblems

- Beret bar circa 1992
- Abbreviation: IAAR

The iWombe Anti-Aircraft Regiment (formerly Regiment Oos Transvaal) is a reserve air defence regiment of the South African Army.

== History ==
=== Origin ===
Regiment Oos Transvaal was established on 1 October 1964. Its first headquarters was a Magistrates Court office in Brakpan in 1968, but by 1975, its headquarters had moved on to Benoni. Renamed Apex Military Base, it was opened officially by Lt Gen Geldenhuys in 1976.

=== Equipment ===
Regiment Oos Transvaal was originally meant to be equipped with 35 mm Oerlikon but by December 1964, a decision was made that Regiment Oos Transvaal would use Bofors and Oerlikon guns, comprising a Bofors regiment, two 40 mm Bofors batteries and a 35 mm Oerlikon battery. In 1977, however, the regiment had been equipped as a 20 mm anti-aircraft cannon regiment, with six batteries each of 18 guns.

=== Operations ===
Regiment Oos Transvaal supplied its R Battery for service in Operation Savannah in January/March 1976 while its P Battery served in the same border area from March to May.

Regiment Oos Transvaal formed part of a reaction force in 1980 but by 1983 forward, members of the Regiment were involved directly in a number of operations such as Operation Prone in 1988.

=== Present day ===
Regiment Oos Transvaal is currently equipped with the Oerlikon GDF Mk.5 35 mm gun.

=== Name Change ===
In August 2019, 52 Reserve Force units had their names changed to reflect the diverse military history of South Africa. Regiment Oos Transvaal became the iWombe Anti-Aircraft Regiment, and have 3 years to design and implement new regimental insignia.

== Regimental symbols ==
=== Previous Dress Insignia ===
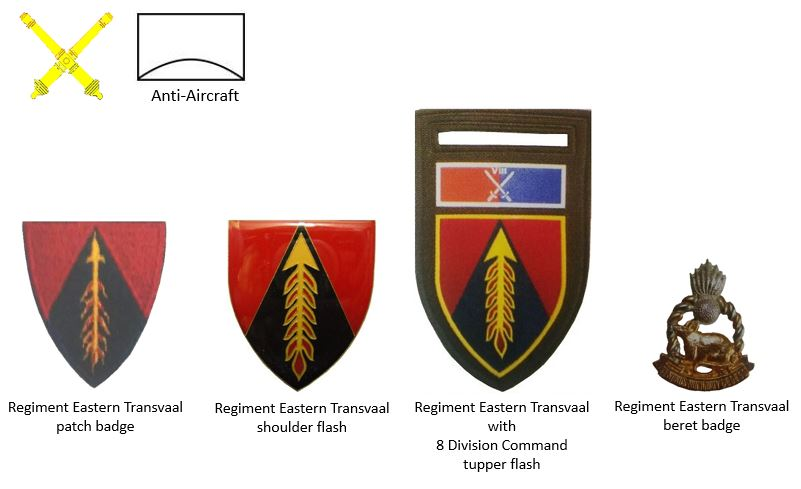
SADF era Regiment Eastern Transvaal insignia

== Battle honours ==
- Operation Savannah (Southern Angola)

== Freedom of the city ==
The Freedom of Brakpan was granted to the Regiment on 14 April 1984.
