= Bede people =

Indo-Aryan nomadic group

Bede
বেদে
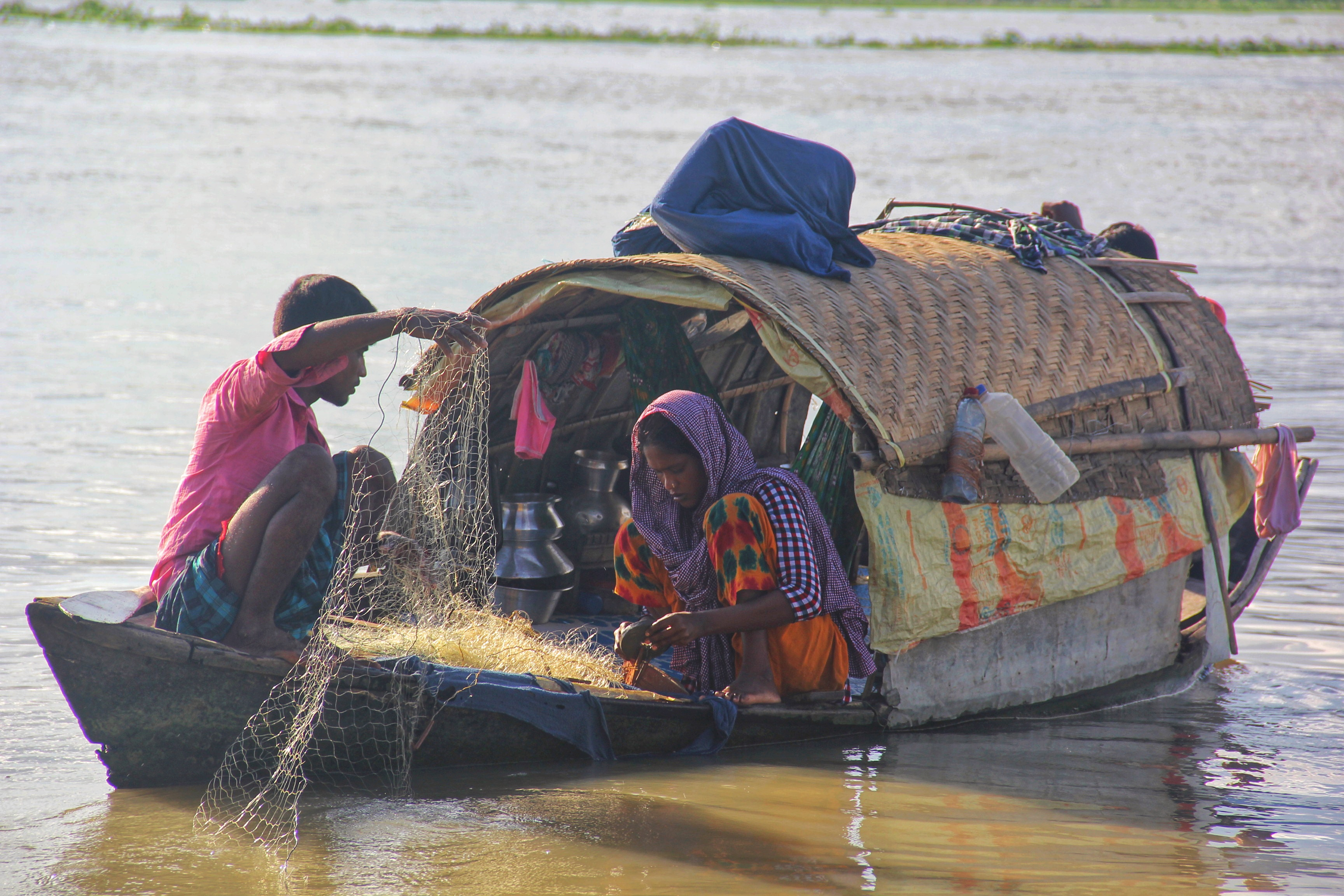
- A Bede family in their house boat

Total population
- 500,000–1 million

Languages
- Bengali • Thar

Religion
- Islam (predominantly); Hinduism, Animism, Shamanism, Syncretism (minority)

Related ethnic groups
- Bengalis, Rohingyas, Bunos, Sapurias, Domas, Doms, Romanis, Bedouins

The Bede people, Bedeni or Bedey, also known as Mon-tong, are an Indo-Aryan nomadic ethnic group of Bangladesh. They traditionally live, travel, and earn their living on the river. Bedes travel in groups and never stay in one place for more than a couple of months. They are similar to European Roma.

Bedes are considered a marginalized group in Bangladesh. Historically the Bedes were unable to vote as they did not own land, nor could they apply for bank loans or microcredit for the same reason. This situation persisted until 2008, when they were finally granted the right to vote.

== Etymology ==
The Bedes are also known by names such as Badiya, Baidya, or Boiddani, which originate from the term Baidya (meaning healer or physician). Historically, the Bedes have been involved in various forms of traditional medicine, including herbal remedies and spiritual healing practices. The Bedes are descendants of the Mon-tong tribe from the Arakan kingdom, and they often prefer to identify themselves as Mon-tong.

== History ==
Determining the origins and spread of the Bedey community is a challenging and contentious issue. It is said that in 1638, a group arrived in Dhaka alongside the exiled King Ballal of Arakan. Later, they converted to Islam. Initially settling in Bikrampur, they eventually spread to remote areas of Bangladesh and even to parts of West Bengal and Assam in India. Some theories suggest that the Bedes originated from ancient Egypt and are related to the Bedouin people, with the term "Bede" deriving from "Bedouin." According to Bede folklore, they once established a kingdom in Pandua, located in the Hooghly district of West Bengal, India. Another popular belief is that the Bedes are descendants of the Malla Kings of Bishnupur in the Bankura district of West Bengal.

In 2008, Bede community were granted the voting rights for the first time in Bangladesh. Prior to 2008, the Bedes were denied voting rights due to their lack of land ownership and were unable to access bank loans or microcredit.

== Language ==
The total population of Bede community is estimated from 500,000 to 1 million. Majority of the Bedes speak Bengali as their mother tongue and as per some sources only 40,000 people of Bede community speak Thar as their first language. Thet or Thar is the distinct language variety of Bede. Thar speakers use this language when conversing among themselves but speak Bengali when interacting with Bengali speakers. The language has significant similarities with the language of the Rakhine people. Many of the words used in Thet are derived from the early Prakrit form of the Bengali language.

== Society and culture ==
=== Community ===
The Bedes live in a communal society, adhering to traditional customs and staying together as a group. Although their society is patriarchal, women play a crucial role within the community. The Bede men are often seen as idle, while the women are responsible for most of the hard labor. The Bedes typically build temporary platforms or live on boats near rivers and lowlands, with the boat being a highly valued asset. They travel across rural Bangladesh for trade, especially during the harvest season, a practice known as "gawal" in their language. Women predominantly participate in these travels, carrying baskets for snakes or medicinal items. The Bedes set out for gawal in the late Agrayan and mid-Ashar months, returning to their permanent residence after completing their trade journey by mid-Chaitra and mid-Ashwin. During these journeys, they either walk or travel by boat, staying in local boats, tents, or school verandas as they travel from village to village. The Bede community in Bangladesh is divided into nine distinct branches or sub-groups. These are: Lauyo, Chapailya, Bajikar, Bej, Gayin, Mellach, Bandaira, Mal and Shapuria (snake charmer).

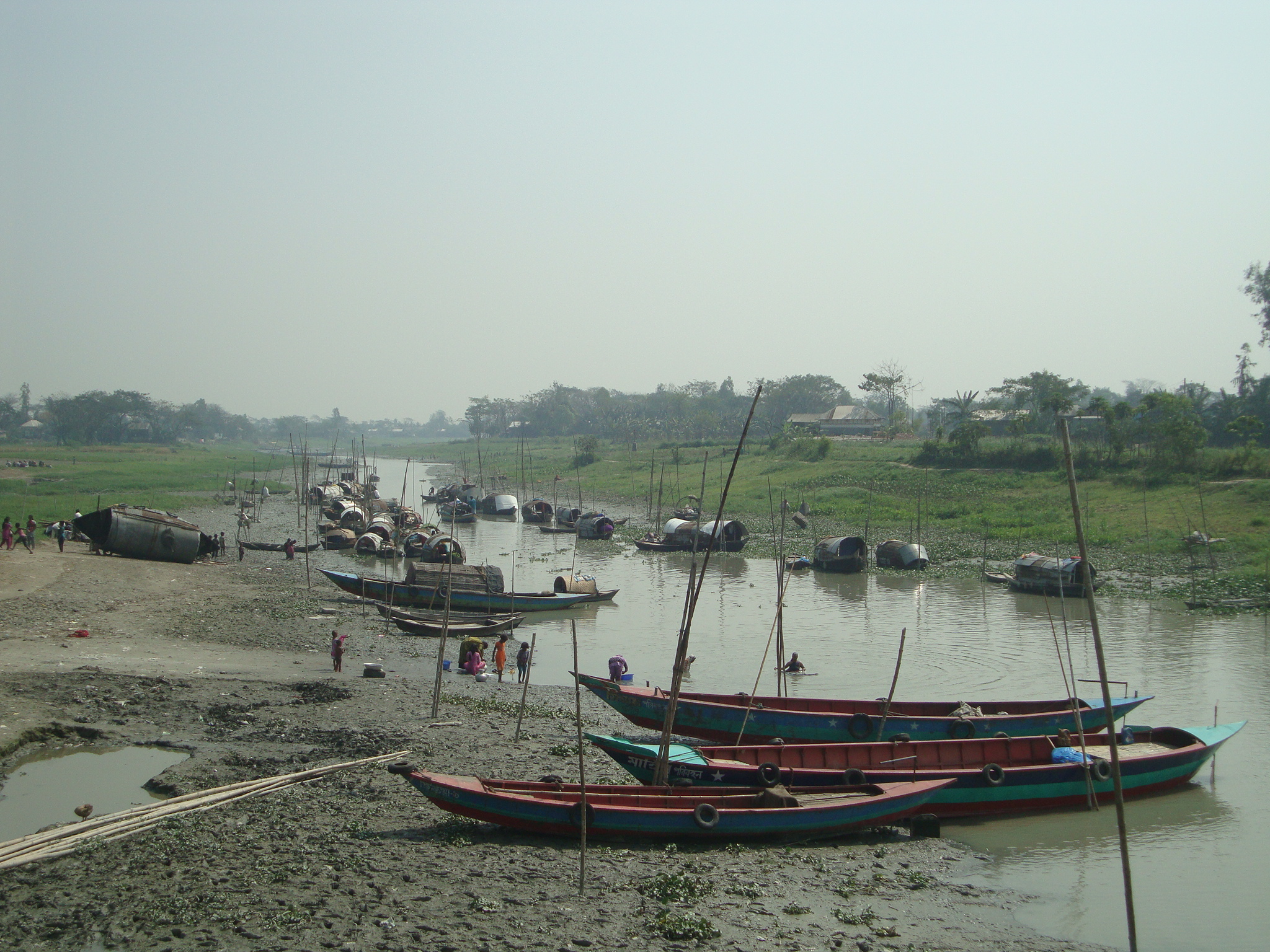
A Bede settlement in Munshiganj

Each Bede family typically possesses its own boat, and several families and boats together form a group. Multiple groups then make up a "Bahor" (Clan) and several "Bahors" collectively constitute a sub-clan. The leader of a "Bahor" is known as the Sardar. Each "Bahor" is overseen by a Sardar, who divides the group into smaller units, with a director in charge of each unit. The Sardar determines the trade routes and areas for the teams, ensuring they can stay in contact with him if needed. The Sardar is responsible for maintaining order within the "Bahor" and adjudicating disputes. If any team fails to return to their permanent settlement by a set deadline, the Sardar can demand an explanation and impose penalties. The Sardar also receives fees during marriages and gifts on special occasions.

In addition to the Sardar of the "Bahor," there are also sub-clan and clan Sardars. At a predetermined time and location, all Bahor Sardars convene to elect these higher-level Sardars. Historically, these meetings occurred during the Kartik Baruni fair at the confluence of the Ganges and Brahmaputra rivers near Munshiganj. Nowadays, the Bedes gather annually between Kartik 5th and Ograhayan 15th in Munshiganj and Chattogram, where they hold elections and resolve any unresolved disputes.

=== Clothing ===
Bede men traditionally wear lungis, while women dress in two pieces of a ten-cubit long fabric. One piece is wrapped around the waist in a double twist, and the other is draped over the shoulder like a scarf, with fatuya or angi (loose shirt without collar) worn on the upper body. However, many Bede men and women have increasingly adopted attire similar to that of the general Bengali people in recent times.

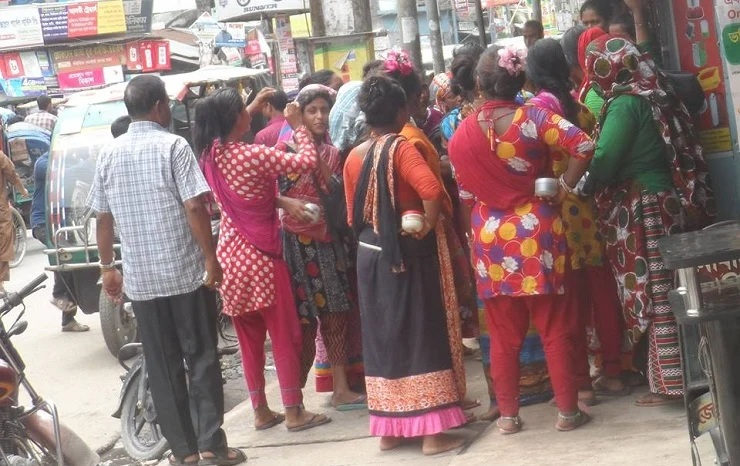
A group of Bede Women

=== Marriage ===
The Bedes often organize various celebrations and festivals where marriage takes place with mutual consent between the bride and groom, along with approval from their guardians. Young men and women enjoy complete freedom in choosing their partners. After marriage, the husband moves into the wife's household, and the wife is required to commit to caring for her husband and children. During social gatherings, if an outsider attends, they are sometimes encouraged to marry a Bede woman, who, once married, is often absorbed into the Bede community. In cases where an outsider marries a Bede woman through deceit, they must pay compensation. Some Bede tribes follow unique marriage customs. In one such tradition, before marriage, the groom must climb to the top of a tall tree and remain there. The bride, standing below, pleads with him to come down, offering various promises. She vows to take care of the household, serve his parents, and raise their children. Despite these assurances, the groom remains seated in the tree. The bride then promises never to complain and to obey him unconditionally, yet the groom still does not descend. Finally, when the bride declares that she will support him financially for life and that he won't have to provide for her, the groom agrees to come down, and the marriage takes place. In another custom among some tribes, the bride must offer a dowry, with the amount depending on her financial capacity. This dowry is entrusted to the head woman of the tribe.

In Bede society, there is no practice of polygamy or joint families. Widows are free to remarry without any social barriers. Although the Bedes identify as Muslims, the women do not practice purdah (veiling). Bede women are highly independent, and in the event of a divorce, property and even custody of children are typically divided, with the wife receiving the larger share.

=== Religion ===
Most of them are Muslim but also practice Hinduism, Shamanism and Animism along with Islam. They are related to other South Asian nomadic groups, such as the Dom and Buno people.

=== Occupation ===
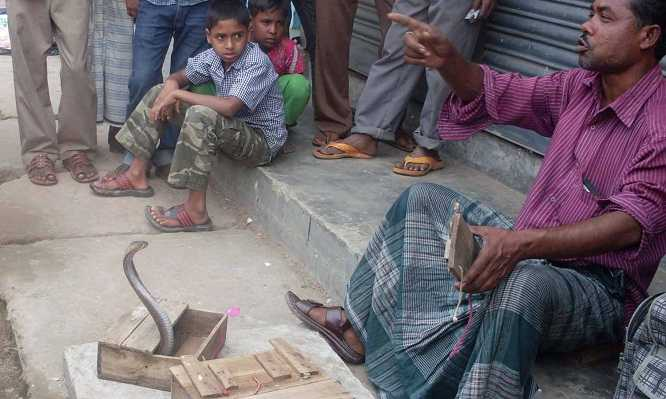
Bede man showcasing a snake charming performance.

The majority of the Bedes live on snake related trading, such as snake charming (training), snake catching, snake selling, etc. They also sell lucky heathers and herbal medicines, which they claim have magical properties. They utilize wild plants, herbs, and roots as herbal treatments and heavily incorporate rituals such as incantations and charms in their healing practices. The Bede are known for their expertise in treating children, as well as providing relief for ailments like rheumatism and toothache, often using herbal ointments. Bedes' other occupations are in the entertainment services (e.g. monkey shows, magic shows) and petty trading.

The Lauyo Bedeys are known for selling fish and garlands made from fish bones. This group originates from several areas, including Biania in Munshiganj, Charar Ghope in Narayanganj, and in Comilla. In contrast, the Gain Bedeys specialize in selling aromatic spices and are primarily from Netrokona. The Bej Bedes, also known as Michchigiri, specialize in treating eye diseases and reside in Barisal, Pirojpur, and Nawabganj. They perform eye surgeries using broken glass. The Chapailya Bedes, or Shajdar, focus on selling garlands made from fish bones, tiger's paws, and bird bones, which are believed to relieve muscle pain and other bodily ailments. Additionally, they offer opium, pearl ornaments, bangles, crescent-shaped necklaces, and cockles. They are also skilled in crafting and marketing Sanas (weaving sticks) for weavers. Expert divers among the Bedes come from Tongi, Demra, and Badda in Dhaka, Saturia in Manikganj, the tea gardens of Mirzapur, and Amirabad in Comilla. The Bajikar and Mellach Bedes sell fox bones and hornbill oil. The Shialya Bedes do not engage in trade with other Bede groups and consume a wide range of animals, including cows, boars, and snakes, and worship Hindu deities. They are primarily located in Lalmonirhat and the bordering areas of India. The Bandaira Bedes, mainly residing in Lalmonirhat, sell parts of monkey bodies for medicinal purposes and earn income through monkey shows. They sing praises of Rama and Lakshman and depict the ferocity of Rama and Ravana as well as the exploits of Hanuman. The Mal Bedes are known for their work in healing snake poison, extracting tooth worms, selling arthritis medicines, and blowing horns. They capture and sell snakes but do not perform snake shows. They live in Madaripur, Munshiganj, Dhaka, Rajshahi, Comilla, and Noakhali. The Shapurias, or snake charmers, sell amulets and talismans, capture snakes, and perform snake shows, but do not sell the snakes themselves. They worship Manasa, the goddess of snakes, and are found in Munshiganj, Dhaka, and Sunamganj, Sylhet.

== Contemporary issues ==
The advancement of modern technology, infrastructure development, and progress in medical science has reduced the demand for traditional practices of the Bede community, such as spiritual healing, snake charming, and monkey dancing. As entertainment increasingly shifts to smartphones and digital devices, these traditional professions have become less profitable. Consequently, many Bede women have been driven to beg in urban areas like Dhaka out of necessity.

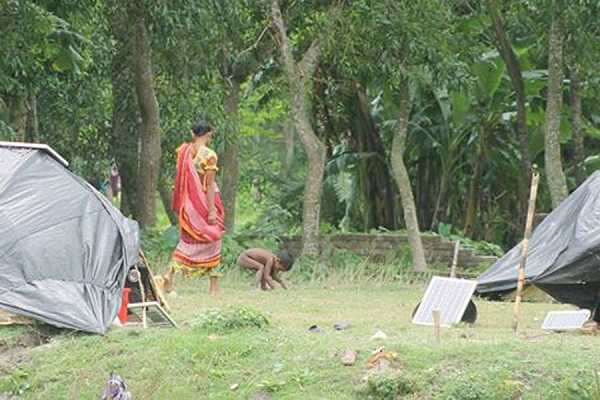
A Bede family living in a polythene tent.

Among minority groups in Bangladesh, the Bedes are among the most disadvantaged and marginalized. They lack essential rights and basic needs, including food, shelter, sanitation, health services, information, and education. Many Bedes struggle to adapt to the rapidly changing, globalized world due to a lack of skills and knowledge. Prior to 2008, the Bedes were denied voting rights due to their lack of land ownership and were unable to access bank loans or microcredit. Since 2008, however, the Bede community has been granted the right to vote.

The younger generation of Bede is increasingly disinterested in their ancestral professions, perceiving them as offering limited prospects and social respect. Many young Bedes are now seeking to integrate into mainstream society and achieve a more recognized social status. They prefer stable living conditions in permanent housing with modern amenities over the transient and impoverished lifestyle associated with traditional boat-based living. Reports suggest that many Bedes have already left their traditional way of life for more stable circumstances and are showing growing interest in education and better career opportunities.

=== Welfare ===
Many Bedes have been allocated permanent housing and a two-decimal plot of land through the Ashrayan Project initiated by the Bangladesh Government. In 2022, the project provided homes to 59 Bede families—31 from Badedihi village and 28 from Kashipur village within Kaliganj municipality. These homes were part of the Ashrayan Project's largest Bede housing site, located near Majdia Baor in Jhenaidah district.

In the proposed budget for the fiscal year 2025, presented to Parliament on 6 June, Finance Minister Abul Hassan Mahmood Ali announced plans to expand this support to cover 12,629 Hijra community members in the coming fiscal year. Additionally, allowances for the Bede community will continue, with plans to include 9,832 individuals from other disadvantaged groups under the allowance program. Abul Hassan Mahmood Ali also stated that educational stipend programs for marginalized communities, including Hijra and Bede, will continue to enhance their educational opportunities.

== Genetics ==
Genetic analysis points to possible connections between the Bedeys and certain subgroups of the Australo-Melanesian populations, particularly Aboriginal Australians. These groups share some physical traits and genetic markers, including a high percentage of Agglutinogens 'A' in their blood, which is also prevalent in Indian Subcontinents' indigenous Australasian populations and Australian Aboriginal people.

== Literature ==
- Brandt, Carmen (2018). The 'Bedes' of Bengal: Establishing an Ethnic Group through Portrayals. Zürich: LIT Verlag. ISBN 978-3-643-90670-0.
