= Tourist Police (Bangladesh) =

Tourist Police ট্যুরিস্ট পুলিশ

Agency overview
- Formed: 2013; 13 years ago

Jurisdictional structure
- Operations jurisdiction: Bangladesh
- Governing body: Ministry of Home Affairs
- General nature: Civilian police

Operational structure
- Headquarters: Fareast Tower, Topkhana Road, Purana Paltan, Dhaka 1000
- Elected officer responsible: Salahuddin Ahmed, Minister of Home Affairs
- Agency executive: Md. Mainul Hasan, PPM, NDC, Addl. Inspector General
- Parent agency: Bangladesh Police
- Units: 45

Website
- touristpolice.gov.bd
- Service uniform: Yankees Blue, Light French Beige Combat uniform: Navy Blue, Khaki

Tourist Police (Bengali: ট্যুরিস্ট পুলিশ, romanized: Ṭyurisṭa puliśa) is a special branch of the Bangladesh Police, responsible for investigating crimes against tourists and providing security in tourist areas. Additional IG Md. Mainul Hasan, PPM, NDC is the chief of Tourist Police.

== History ==
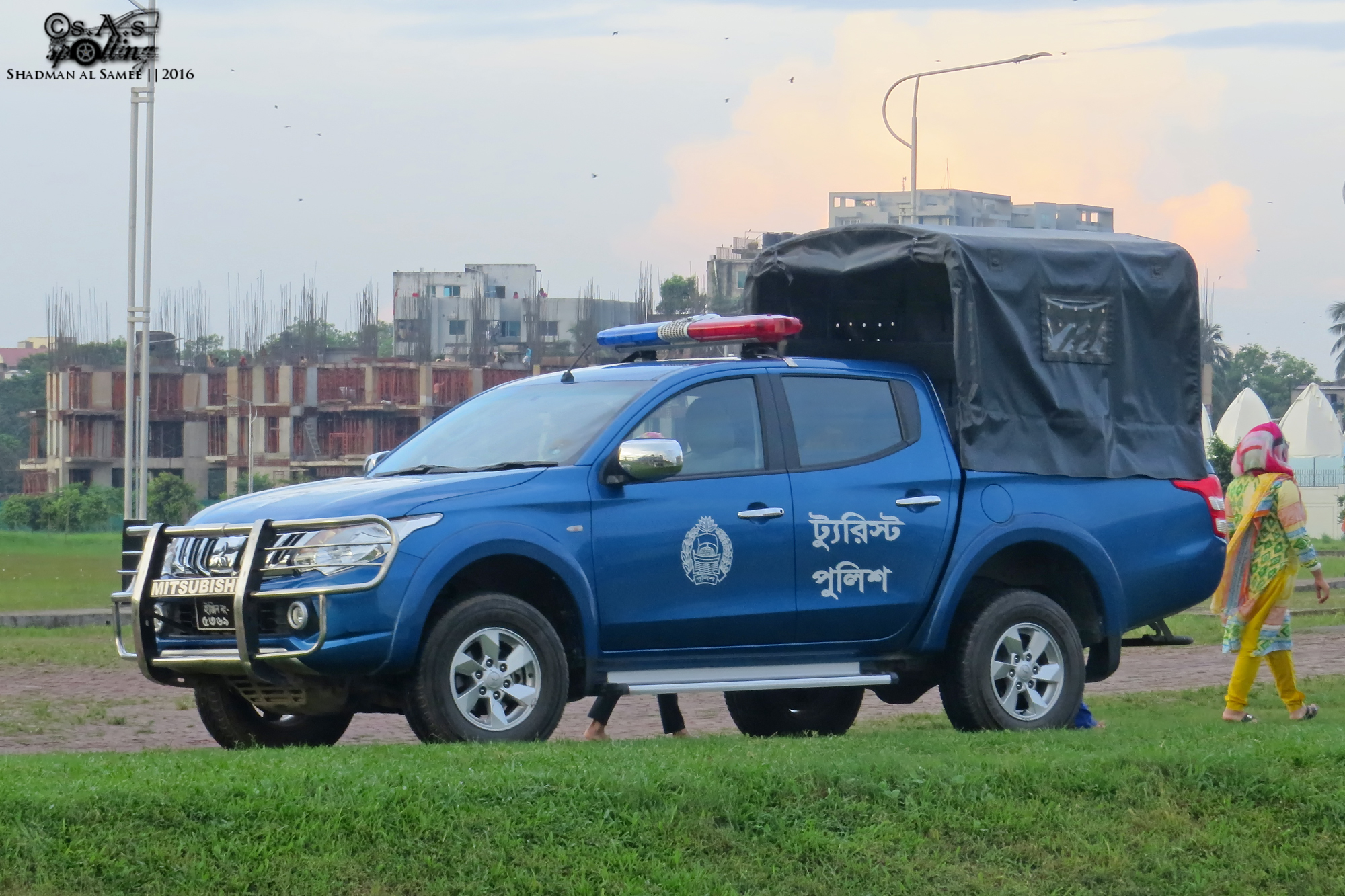
A Tourist Police Mitsubishi L200 in 2016.

The unit was formed by the government of Bangladesh, led by Prime Minister Sheikh Hasina. It was established in 2013. In February 2017, the unit launched a smart phone app, Hello Tourist, that contains relevant information for tourists in Bangladesh.

== Units ==
Tourist Police has three administrative region. An Additional DIG of Bangladesh police is appointed as in-charge of a region. They are:

Sub-Zone	Zone	Region	Division	DIvisional HQ
Dhaka	Dhaka	Dhaka	Dhaka, Sylhet, Mymensingh	Banasree, Rampura, Dhaka
Gazipur	Dhaka	Dhaka	Dhaka, Sylhet, Mymensingh	Banasree, Rampura, Dhaka
Narsingdi	Dhaka	Dhaka	Dhaka, Sylhet, Mymensingh	Banasree, Rampura, Dhaka
Narayanganj	Dhaka	Dhaka	Dhaka, Sylhet, Mymensingh	Banasree, Rampura, Dhaka
Munshiganj & Padma Bridge	Dhaka	Dhaka	Dhaka, Sylhet, Mymensingh	Banasree, Rampura, Dhaka
Jaflong	Sylhet	Sylhet	Dhaka, Sylhet, Mymensingh	Banasree, Rampura, Dhaka
Sreemangal	Moulvibazar	Sylhet	Dhaka, Sylhet, Mymensingh	Banasree, Rampura, Dhaka
Madhabkunda	Moulvibazar	Sylhet	Dhaka, Sylhet, Mymensingh	Banasree, Rampura, Dhaka
Mymensingh	Mymensingh	Mymensingh	Dhaka, Sylhet, Mymensingh	Banasree, Rampura, Dhaka
Tangail	Mymensingh	Mymensingh	Dhaka, Sylhet, Mymensingh	Banasree, Rampura, Dhaka
Chattogram	Chattogram	Chattogram	Chattogram	Khulshi, Chattogram
Patenga	Chattogram	Chattogram	Chattogram	Khulshi, Chattogram
Parkir Char	Chattogram	Chattogram	Chattogram	Khulshi, Chattogram
Cumilla		Chattogram	Chattogram	Khulshi, Chattogram
Cox's Bazar	Cox's Bazar	Cox's Bazar	Chattogram	Khulshi, Chattogram
Inani	Cox's Bazar	Cox's Bazar	Chattogram	Khulshi, Chattogram
Dulahazara Safari Park	Cox's Bazar	Cox's Bazar	Chattogram	Khulshi, Chattogram
Teknaf	Teknaf	Cox's Bazar	Chattogram	Khulshi, Chattogram
Saint Martin	Teknaf	Cox's Bazar	Chattogram	Khulshi, Chattogram
Rangamati	Rangamati	Rangamati	Chattogram	Khulshi, Chattogram
Kaptai	Rangamati	Rangamati	Chattogram	Khulshi, Chattogram
Khagrachhari	Khagrachhari	Rangamati	Chattogram	Khulshi, Chattogram
Sajek	Khagrachhari	Rangamati	Chattogram	Khulshi, Chattogram
Bandarban	Bandarban	Bandarban	Chattogram	Khulshi, Chattogram
Thanchi	Bandarban	Bandarban	Chattogram	Khulshi, Chattogram
Khulna		Khulna	Khulna, Barishal, Rajshahi, Rangpur	Mujgunni, Boyra, Khulna
Bagerhat		Khulna	Khulna, Barishal, Rajshahi, Rangpur	Mujgunni, Boyra, Khulna
Satkhira		Khulna	Khulna, Barishal, Rajshahi, Rangpur	Mujgunni, Boyra, Khulna
Gopalganj (Tungipara)		Khulna	Khulna, Barishal, Rajshahi, Rangpur	Mujgunni, Boyra, Khulna
Kushtia	Kushtia	Khulna	Khulna, Barishal, Rajshahi, Rangpur	Mujgunni, Boyra, Khulna
Meherpur	Kushtia	Khulna	Khulna, Barishal, Rajshahi, Rangpur	Mujgunni, Boyra, Khulna
Barishal		Barishal	Khulna, Barishal, Rajshahi, Rangpur	Mujgunni, Boyra, Khulna
Kuakata	Kuakata	Barishal	Khulna, Barishal, Rajshahi, Rangpur	Mujgunni, Boyra, Khulna
Payra Bandar	Kuakata	Barishal	Khulna, Barishal, Rajshahi, Rangpur	Mujgunni, Boyra, Khulna
Rangpur	Rangpur	Rangpur	Khulna, Barishal, Rajshahi, Rangpur	Mujgunni, Boyra, Khulna
Nilphamari	Rangpur	Rangpur	Khulna, Barishal, Rajshahi, Rangpur	Mujgunni, Boyra, Khulna
Dinajpur		Rangpur	Khulna, Barishal, Rajshahi, Rangpur	Mujgunni, Boyra, Khulna
Panchagarh		Rangpur	Khulna, Barishal, Rajshahi, Rangpur	Mujgunni, Boyra, Khulna
Rajshahi	Rajshahi	Rajshahi	Khulna, Barishal, Rajshahi, Rangpur	Mujgunni, Boyra, Khulna
Naogaon	Rajshahi	Rajshahi	Khulna, Barishal, Rajshahi, Rangpur	Mujgunni, Boyra, Khulna
Natore	Rajshahi	Rajshahi	Khulna, Barishal, Rajshahi, Rangpur	Mujgunni, Boyra, Khulna
Sirajganj		Rajshahi	Khulna, Barishal, Rajshahi, Rangpur	Mujgunni, Boyra, Khulna
Bogura		Rajshahi	Khulna, Barishal, Rajshahi, Rangpur	Mujgunni, Boyra, Khulna
