= International Mother Language Award =

Civilian award in Bangladesh

- Description: This award is given to recognize unique contributions to mother languages at the national and international levels.
- Location: Dhaka, Bangladesh
- Country: Bangladesh
- Presented by: Bangladesh
- Hosted by: Government of Bangladesh
- First award: 2021
- Final award: Present
- Website: www.imli.gov.bd

The International Mother Language Award is a civilian award of Bangladesh. This award was created in 2021 to recognize special contributions to mother languages worldwide. The award is given every two years for contributions to the practice and preservation of mother tongues at the national and international level.

== History ==
This award was launched by the Government of Bangladesh in celebration of Mujib Year, the birth ceremony of the first president of Bangladesh, Sheikh Mujibur Rahman. This award was launched under the Ministry of Education of Bangladesh

On International Mother Language Day, this award is given by the International Mother Language Institute. This award was given to two international and two Bangladeshi recipients: Muhammad Rafiq and Mathura Bikash Tripura from Bangladesh, Ismailov Gulam Mirzayevich from Uzbekistan and Activismo Lenguas from Bolivia.

== Award winners ==
=== Year 2021 ===
- Mohammad Rafiqul Islam - Bangladesh
- Mathura Bikash Tripura - Bangladesh
- Islaimov Gulom Mirzaevich - Uzbekistan
- The Activismo Lenguas or Language Activism of Bolivia -Bolivia
