= Buno people =

Ethnic group of Bangladesh

Buno is an ethnic minority people of Bangladesh mostly found in Rajshahi, Rangpur, Khulna, Faridpur, Jashore and Dhaka. They are nomadic tribal people.
