= List of South African military bases =

This article details the bases owned by the various branches of the South African Military and the use of these places.

== Navy ==
The South African Navy has naval bases along the coast of South Africa.

=== Eastern Cape ===
In the Eastern Cape, military bases include:

Places in Eastern Cape with Military Bases
- Naval Station Port Elizabeth – provides support to visiting ships, no major vessels are based here.

=== KwaZulu-Natal ===
Places in KwaZulu-Natal with Military Bases
- Naval Base Durban – This base was scaled down to a naval station in 2002 with the rationalisation of the fleet. In December 2015 it was redesignated a full naval base and became the home port of the patrol flotilla.

=== Western Cape ===
Places in the Western Cape with Naval Bases

The Navy operates the following naval bases:

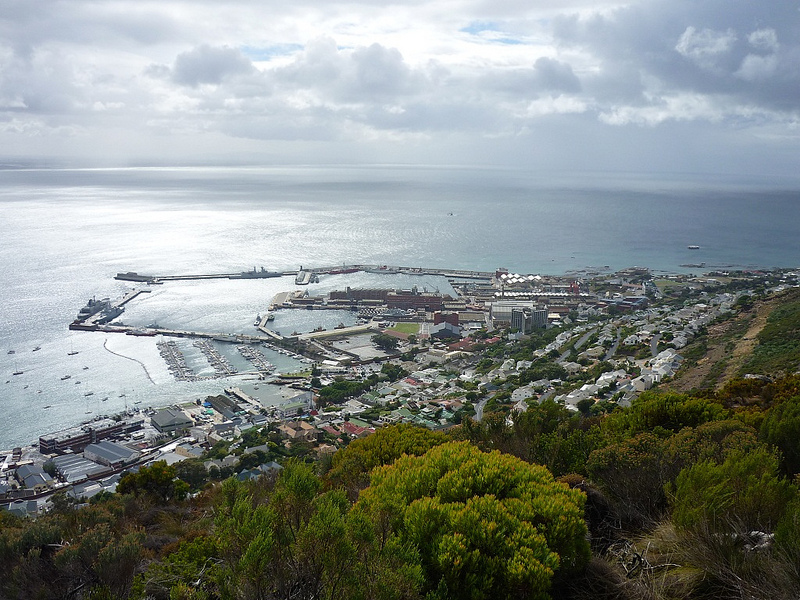
A view of Simon's Town and the naval base

- Naval Base Simon's Town – The base houses the frigate and submarine flotillas as well as support vessels. A naval dockyard is also situated here.

=== Training units ===
- SAS Saldanha – (33°1′13.8″S 18°0′12.6″E) located on the West Coast and provides training and development for ratings.
- SAS Wingfield – (33°54′24.9″S 18°31′53.46″E) located in the Greater Cape Town area. Provides practical training for apprentices and the technical musterings
- SAS Simonsberg – training in gunnery, anti-submarine warfare, communications, diving and seamanship
- South African Naval College, Gordon's Bay – training college for naval officers.
- Maritime Warfare School, Simon's Town
- NBCD School – Nuclear, Biological, Chemical, Damage Control training

== Air Force ==
The South African Air Force has bases serving both the maritime and inland borders of the country.

=== Free State ===
Places in Free State with Military Bases

=== Western Cape ===
Base	Location	Major units
Air Force Base Bloemspruit	29°05′38″S 26°18′14″E	16 Squadron; 87 Helicopter Flying School
Air Force Base Durban	29°58′07″S 30°56′52″E	15 Squadron
Air Force Base Hoedspruit	24°21′17″S 31°03′01″E	19 Squadron
Air Force Base Langebaanweg	32°58′08″S 18°09′55″E	Central Flying School; Silver Falcons
Air Force Base Makhado	23°09′36″S 29°41′48″E	2 Squadron; 85 Combat Flying School
Air Force Base Overberg	34°33′17″S 20°15′02″E	Test Flight and Development Centre
Air Force Base Swartkop	25°48′25″S 28°09′52″E	17 Squadron; South African Air Force Museum
Air Force Base Waterkloof	25°49′48″S 28°13′21″E	2 Squadron; 21 Squadron; 28 Squadron; 41 Squadron; 44 Squadron
Air Force Base Ysterplaat	33°54′04″S 18°29′00″E	22 Squadron; 35 Squadron; 80 Air Navigation School
Air Force Station Port Elizabeth (Note: Designated a "Station" as it is not home to at least one full squadron)	33°59′24″S 25°36′37″E	C Flight of 15 Squadron

== Army ==
The South African Army maintains large bases in all 9 provinces of the country, mostly in or around major cities and towns.

Army Bases in South Africa

=== Eastern Cape ===
- The Grahamstown army base houses the 6 South African Infantry Battalion (Air Assault) and the First City Regiment (Air Assault).
- Gqeberha is home to Prince Alfred's Guard (Air Assault).
- The Mthatha army base is home to the 14 South African Infantry Battalion (Motorised Infantry).
- Greenacres is home to the Regiment Piet Retief (Light Infantry).
- KuGompo City is home to the Buffalo Volunteer Rifles (Light Infantry).
- Bulembu King William's Town

=== Free State ===
- One of the largest bases in the country is Tempe base which is located in Bloemfontein and is home to 1 South African Tank Regiment (Tank Regiment), 1 Special Service Battalion (Armoured Car Regiment), the South African School of Armour (which offers decentralized training to regular and reserve regiments), 44 Parachute Regiment and 1 South African Infantry Battalion (Mechanized Infantry). The parachute training wing is also located here. Bloemfontein is also home to the Regiment Bloemspruit (Light Infantry), Vrystaatse Artillerie Regiment (Artillery) and Regiment President Steyn (Tank Regiment) as well as 3 Military Hospital.
- De Brug Mobilisation Centre, Bloemfontein, next to the N8 route 21 km west of N1 Route.
- Kroonstad is home to the School of Engineers, and the Army Band.
- Bethlehem is home to 2 Field Engineer Regiment.

=== Gauteng ===
Places in Gauteng with Military Bases
- Pretoria is home to a large joint services base called Thaba Tshwane, which is also home to the South African Army College, the National Ceremonial Guard and Band, the Military Police School, 1 Military Hospital, 2 Parachute Battalion, 44 Parachute Engineers, 44 Parachute Anti-Aircraft Regiment (Air Defence Artillery), 1 Military Printing Regiment, Tshwane Regiment (Motorised Infantry), 18 Light Regiment (Artillery) and 4 Survey and Map Regiment. The Dequar Road Base in Pretoria houses the Transvaalse Staatsartillerie (Artillery) and the Pretoria Regiment (Tank Regiment). The Joint Support Base in Wonderboom, Pretoria houses the School of Signals, 1 Signal Regiment, 2 Signal Regiment, 3 Electronic Workshop, 4 Signal Regiment and 5 Signal Regiment. Technical Base Complex Centurion is home to the Technical Service Training Centre, the Army Engineer Formation and a general support base. It also houses units from the SAMHS (e.g. Aviation medicine) and the SAAF.
- Wallmansthal is home to 43 SA Brigade Headquarters.
- Centurion is home to 3 Parachute Battalion.
- Several army bases in Johannesburg house the 21 South African Battalion (Light Infantry), 46 South African Brigade headquarters, 6th Field Engineers Regiment, 1 Construction Regiment, 35th Engineering Supply Regiment, the Rand Light Infantry (Motorised Infantry), The Johannesburg Regiment (Motorised Infantry), the Transvaal Scottish Regiment (Motorised Infantry), Regiment Oos-Rand (Motorised Infantry), the South African Irish Regiment (Motorised Infantry), Regiment President Kruger (Motorised Infantry), the Transvaal Horse Artillery (Artillery) and the Light Horse Regiment (Armoured Car Regiment).
- Benoni is home to Regiment Oos-Transvaal (Air Defence Artillery).
- Springs is home to 6 Light Anti-Aircraft Regiment (Air Defence Artillery).
- The Heidelberg Army Base is home to the SA Army Gymnasium.
- Germiston is home to the Witwatersrand Rifles Regiment (Mechanized Infantry).
- Vereeniging is home to Regiment Vaalrivier (Air Defence Artillery).

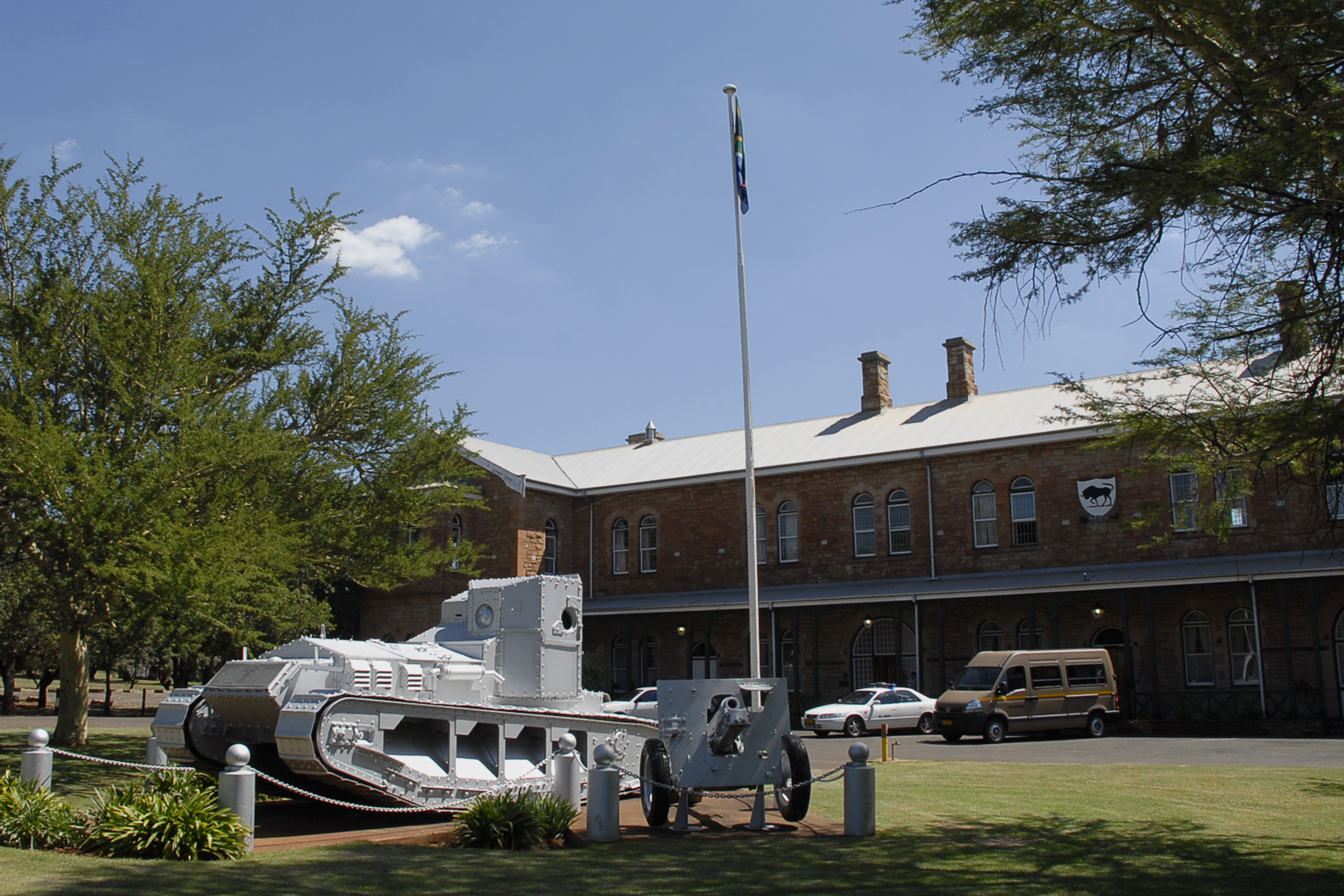
The South African Army College in Pretoria.

=== Western Cape ===
- Several army bases are located in Cape Town and are home to the Army Band, the Cape Town Highlanders Regiment (Mechanized Infantry), the Cape Town Rifles (Motorised Infantry), Cape Garrison Artillery (Air Defence Artillery),
- Youngsfield Military Base near Ottery is home to Regiment Westelike Provinsie (Mechanized Infantry), Regiment Oranjerivier (Armoured Car Regiment) and 3 Field Engineer Regiment.
- Winfield, on the site of the Wingfield Aerodrome, hosts the Cape Field Artillery (Artillery)
- 9th South African Infantry Battalion (Seaborne Infantry) is based at Eerste River
- The Oudtshoorn army base houses the South African Infantry School.

=== Northern Cape ===
- An Army base is located in Kimberley which is home to the Air Defence Artillery School, 10 Anti-Aircraft Regiment (Air Defence Artillery), 3 South African Infantry Battalion (basic training), the Kimberley Regiment (Motorised Infantry) and 44 Anti-Aircraft Regiment (Air Defence Artillery).
- The Lohatla training area and army base is home to the SA Army Combat Training Centre where large army field exercises take place. It also houses the 101 Field Workshop and the 16 Maintenance Unit.
- An Army base in Upington is home to 8 South African Infantry Battalion (Mechanized Infantry).

=== North-West ===
- The Potchefstroom army base is home to the School of Artillery, 4 Artillery Regiment (Artillery), Artillery Mobile Regiment (Artillery), the School of Tactical Intelligence, 1 Tactical Intelligence Regiment, Regiment De La Rey (Mechanized Infantry), Regiment Potchefstroom Universiteit (Artillery) and Regiment Mooirivier (Armoured Car Regiment).
- The Mahikeng Army base is home to 10 South African Infantry Battalion (Motorised Infantry).
- Orkney is home to Regiment Skoonspruit (Motorised Infantry).
- The Zeerust Army Base is home to 2 South African Infantry Battalion (Motorised Infantry).
- Berede Center - is home to Horses (Mounted Infantry army), Bike Squad (Motorcycle Mounted Infantry) This is the South African training ground before deployment to SWA/Namibia. The SWASPES Unit is based in Otavi, they are moved from Oshivello in 1979.

=== KwaZulu-Natal ===
Places in KwaZulu-Natal with Military Bases
- Durban is home to an Army Band, the Durban Light Infantry (Motorised Infantry), Natal Field Artillery (Artillery), Natal Mounted Rifles (Tank Regiment), Umvoti Mounted Rifles (Armoured Car Regiment), the Durban Regiment (Motorised Infantry) and the 19 Field Engineer Regiment.
- Pietermaritzburg is home to the Natal Carbineers (Motorised Infantry).
- The Mtubatuba army base is home to 121 South African Infantry Battalion (Motorised Infantry).
- The Ladysmith army base is home to 5 South African Infantry Battalion.

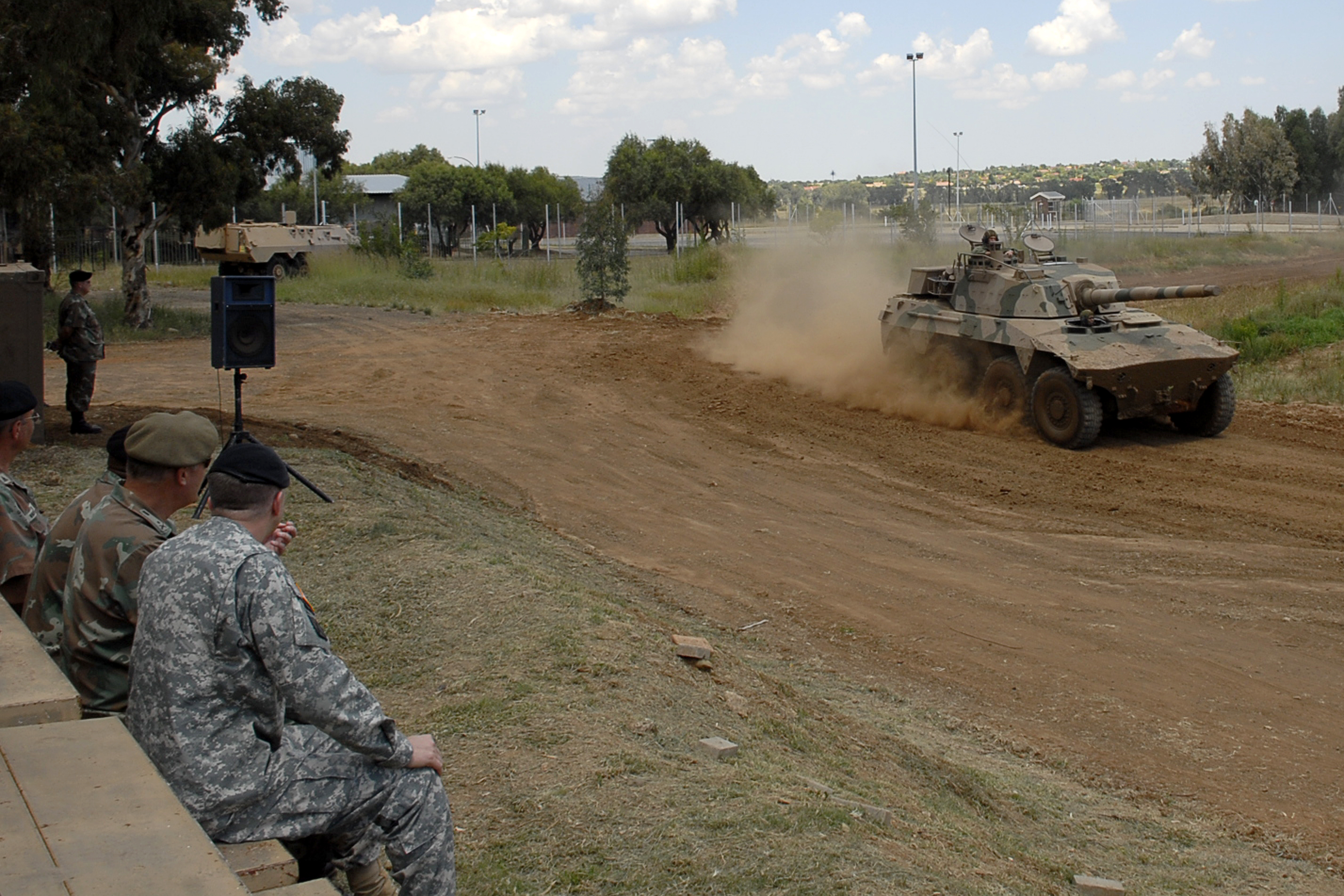
1 Special Service Battalion at Tempe Base.

=== Mpumalanga ===
- Middelburg Army base is home to 4 South African Infantry Battalion (Motorised Infantry).
- Barberton is home to Regiment Botha (Motorised Infantry).

=== Limpopo ===
- The Polokwane army base is home to an Army Band and Regiment Christiaan Beyers (Motorised Infantry).
- The Phalaborwa army base is home to 7 South African Infantry Battalion (Motorised Infantry) and 5 Special Forces Regiment.
- The Thohoyandou army base is home to 15 South African Infantry Battalion (Motorised Infantry).

The main South African Army Headquarters are located in Salvokop, Pretoria in the Dequar Road Complex along with the 102 Field Workshop unit, 17 Maintenance Unit and the S.A.M.S Military Health Department.

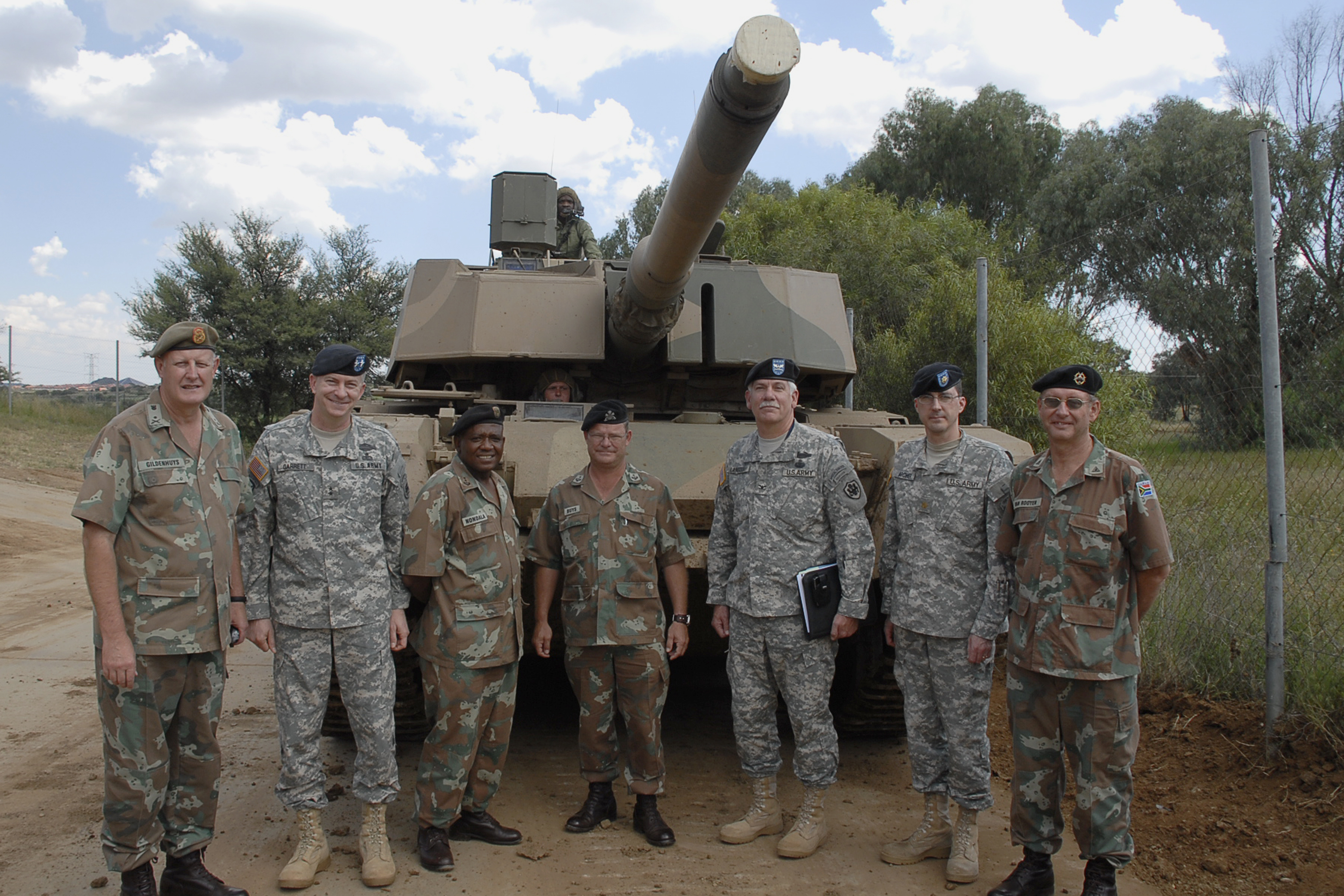
Maj. Gen. William B. Garrett III of United States Army Africa visits the Bloemfontein School of Armour at Tempe Base.

== Special Forces ==
The South African Special Forces Brigade is an independent special forces unit under the direct command of the Chief of the SANDF. It is the only unit permanently assigned to the Joint Operations Division. The unit consists of the following sub-units based at various locations:

- Special Forces Headquarters - Pretoria
- Special Forces School - Murrayhill
- Special Forces Support Unit - Wallmansthal
- 4 Special Forces Regiment - Langebaan
- 5 Special Forces Regiment - Phalaborwa
