= Madzhakandila Anti-Aircraft Regiment =

44 Light Anti-Aircraft Regiment Madzhakandila Anti-Aircraft Regiment
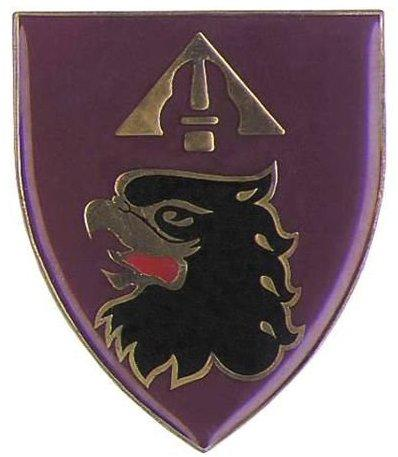
- Active: Jan 1985 -
- Country: South Africa
- Allegiance: Republic of South Africa; Republic of South Africa
- Branch: South African Army; South African Army
- Type: Airborne Anti-Aircraft
- Part of: South African Army Air Defence Artillery Formation
- Garrison/HQ: Cape Town
- Abbreviation: MAAR

The Madzhakandila Anti-Aircraft Regiment (MAAR), formerly 44 Light Anti-Aircraft Regiment, is an air defence regiment of the South African Army.

== History ==
44 Anti-Aircraft Regiment was appointed and designated as a unit of the Citizen Force in January 1985 with the headquarters at Murrayhill (Hammanskraal). The unit struggled to obtain any National Service intake as gunners posted to the parachute brigade were being passed to the battalions and were not being released to the anti-aircraft unit. When the first exercise was held, only 18 parachute-trained gunners were available.

== Operations and exercises ==
- Mocamedes: 44 Anti-Aircraft were to be dropped with the 44 Pathfinders to receive and undergo training from UNITA, on Stinger missiles before the main force dropped. The operation never took place.
- Exercise Vlakwater: September 1989, a full troop with two gun sections of 14.5mm AA guns and one Jakkals vehicle with a Mamba double-barrelled 12.7mm AA gun, was deployed in an air drop.
- Exercise Pegasus: 14 July 1992 at approximately 2330, the then Army Battle School parachute-qualified air defence gunners were dropped over the General De Wet Training Area. Two 24 ft pallets was dropped from a C-130 transport aircraft. At 0700 on 16 July the ground forces were attacked by air (in the form of Skylift radio-controlled aircraft) which were repelled by eight 14.5 mm double-barrelled AA guns and two shoulder-launched missiles.
- Roodepoort Dam: 44 Anti-Aircraft has taken part in brigade "water jumps" over the Roodepoort Dam each year since 1990.

== Ordnance and equipment ==
44 Anti-Aircraft Regiment armament and equipment, consisted of:

- Russian SAM 7 missiles,
- Russian 14.5mm AA guns,
- American .50 Brownings mounted on Jakkals airborne "mini-jeeps".

=== Name Change ===
In August 2019, 52 Reserve Force units had their names changed to reflect the diverse military history of South Africa. 44 Light Anti-Aircraft Regiment became the Madzhakandila Anti-Aircraft Regiment, and have 3 years to design and implement new regimental insignia.

== Leadership ==
| Commander | Period |
|---|---|
| Maj P. Case | 1 Jan 1986 – 31 Dec 1988 |
| Capt J. Roux | 1 Jan 1989 – 31 Mar 1990 |
| Maj J. Lourens | 1 Apr 1991 – 31 Dec 1991 |
| Capt G. Krenzer | 1 Feb 1991 – Information Outstanding |
