= South African Army Support Formation =

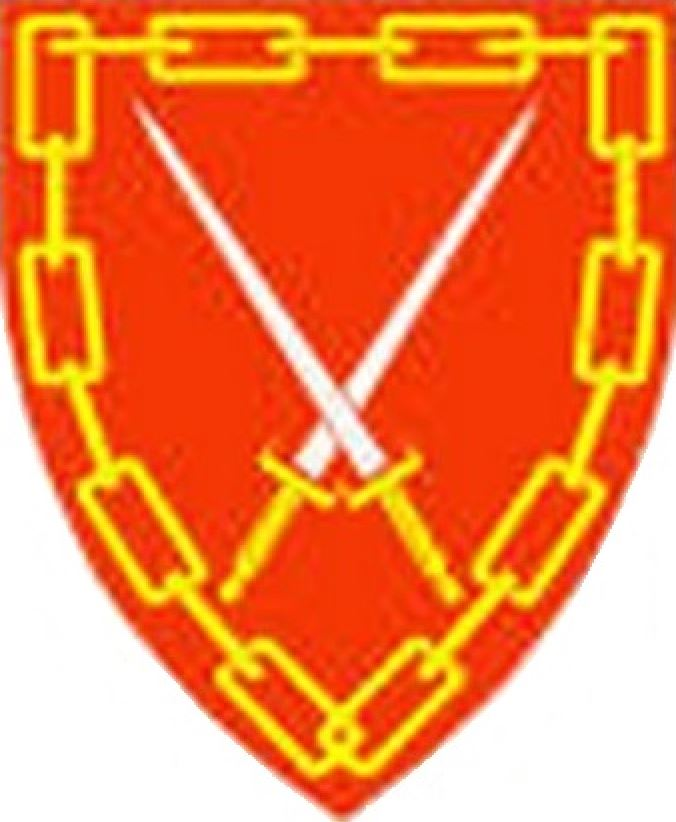
- SANDF Army Support Formation emblem
- Country: South Africa
- Allegiance: South African Army
- Branch
- Type: Military Sustainment/Logistics
- Role: provide effective, efficient and economical sustainment to all SA National Defence Force landward forces and Joint Integrated Military operations
- Part of: South African Army
- Support Formation HQ: Pretoria

The South African Army Support Formation supports and provides sustainment services to all South African Army units.

== Structure ==
SA Army Support Formation HQ
Military Bases	Depots	Units	Reserve Force Units
ASB Bloemfontein	DOD Mobilisation Centre Bloemfontein	SA Army Technical Service Training	4 Maintenance Unit
Joint Support Base Garrison	DOD Main Ordnance Depot	DOD Technical Service Unit	11 Maintenance Unit
ASB Eastern Cape	DOD Main Ordnance Sub Depot	National Ceremonial Guard	15 Maintenance Unit
ASB Johannesburg	DOD Main Ordnance Sub Depot Durban	16 Maintenance Unit	19 Maintenance Unit
ASB Kimberley		17 Maintenance Unit	44 Maintenance Unit
ASB Kwa-Zulu Natal		101 Field Workshop	30 Field Workshop
ASB Limpopo		102 Field Workshop	31 Field Workshop
ASB Potchefstroom			32 Field Workshop
ASB Western Cape			37 Field Workshop SAOSC
ASB Mpumalanga			71 Field Workshop

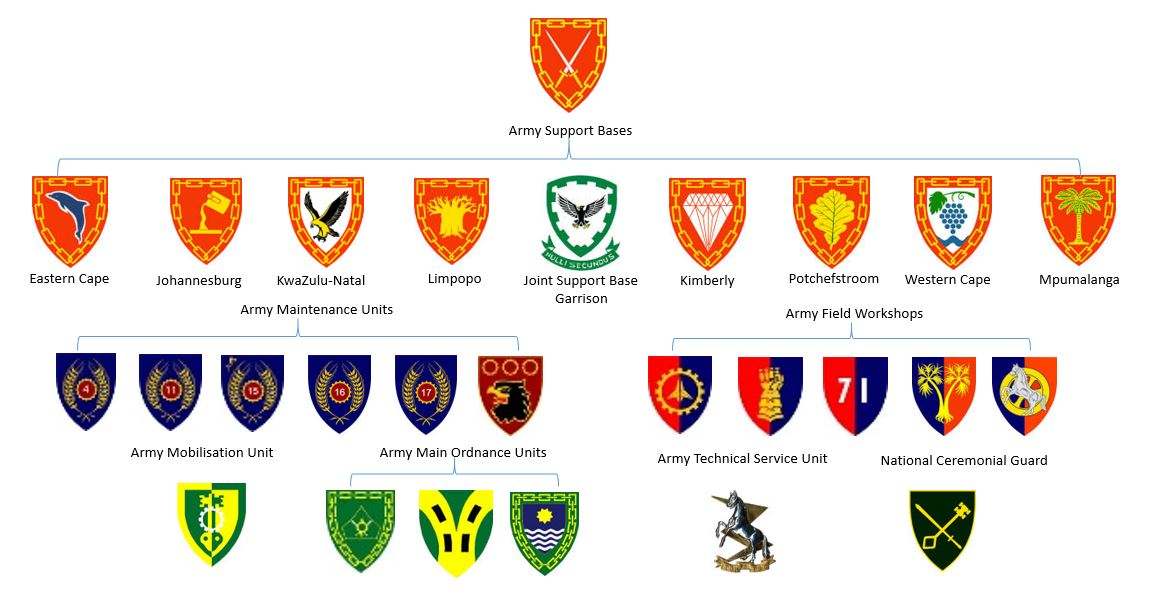
