= 46 South African Brigade =

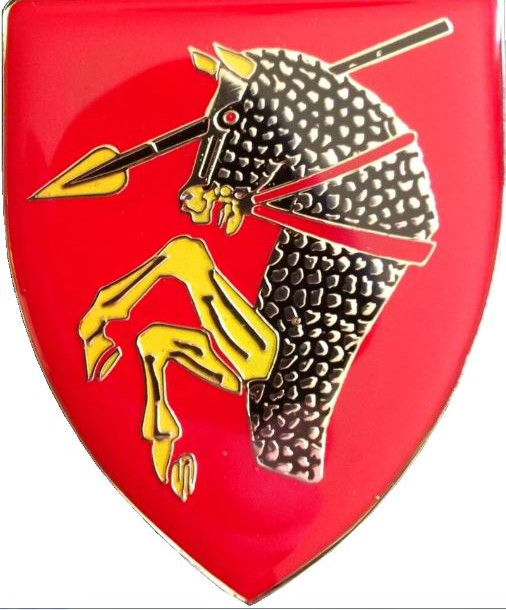
- Active: 1 April 1999–present
- Country: South Africa
- Branch: South African Army
- Role: To be a center of excellence (conventional/peace missions) in providing an affective command and control capability to the SA National Defence Force.
- Part of: Joint Operations Division
- Garrison/HQ: Kensington
- Motto(s): Shield of the Nation

46 South African Brigade was established on April 1, 1999, as part of the restructuring process of the South African Army. Its initial function was to provide a formation headquarters for deployed reserve force elements and support 43 SA Brigade. 46 SA Brigade is a composite brigade consisting of a headquarters in Kensington, Johannesburg and a Brigade Administrative Area at Wallmansthal.

Administratively, the headquarters answers to the Chief of the Army. Operationally and for force training, the formation takes instructions from the Joint Operations Division. Units and subunits are attached as required for the task at hand. When not required, those units remain part of their respective type formations.

== History ==
46 Brigade has taken part in Exercises NDLOVU and SEBOKA in 2007.

== Mandate ==
Its mandate is: "To execute the role of command and control capability for military operations and exercises inside the borders of the Republic of South Africa and externally. This command and control capability must have an inherent flexibility to conduct conventional operations and peace support operations as the situation and missions may dictate."
