= Mapungubwe Regiment =

Second Botha Regiment 59 Reserve Motor Service Company Regiment Christiaan Beyers Regiment Limpopo Regiment Christiaan Beyers Mapungubwe Regiment
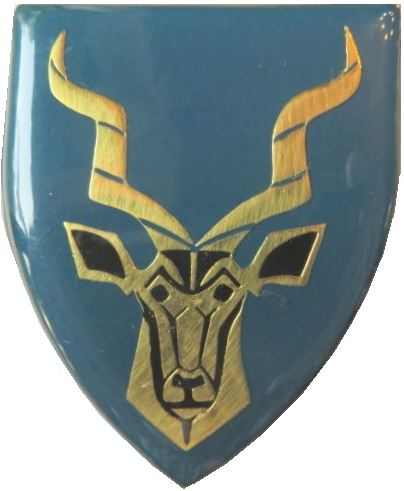
- SANDF Regiment Christiaan Beyers emblem
- Active: 1939 to present
- Country: South Africa
- Branch: South African Army; South African Army
- Type: Infantry Regiment
- Size: One Battalion
- Part of: South African Infantry Formation; Army Conventional Reserve
- Garrison/HQ: Karee Base, Polokwane
- Motto: Ons Dien (We serve)
Battle honours
Battle Honours
Awarded
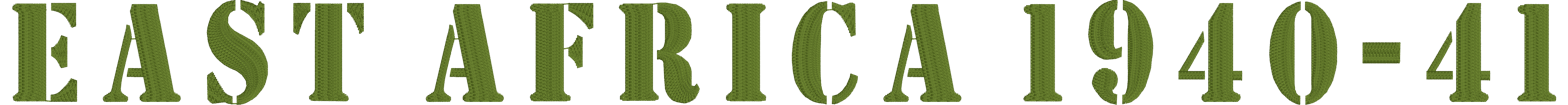

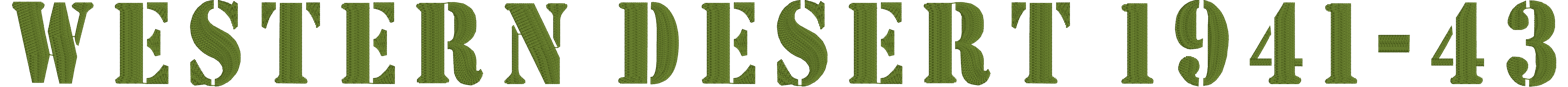

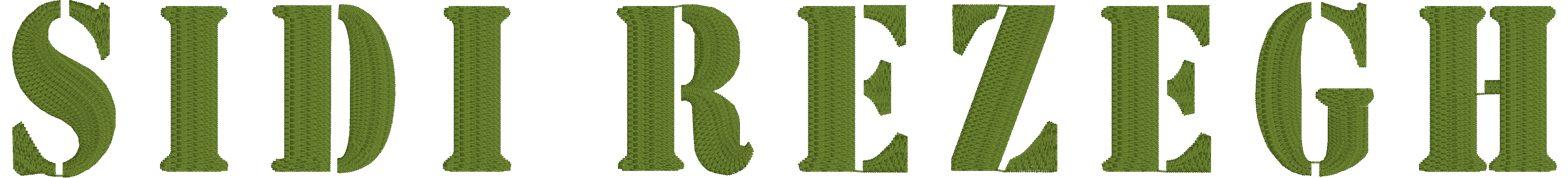

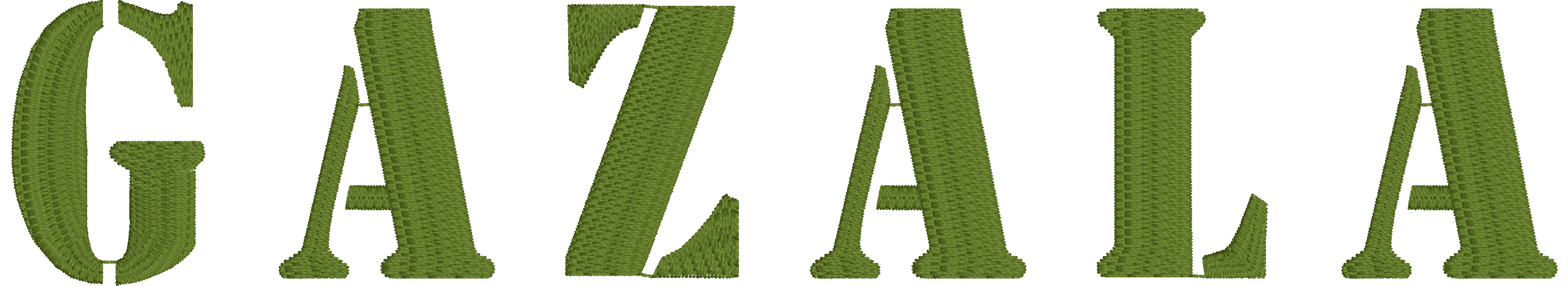

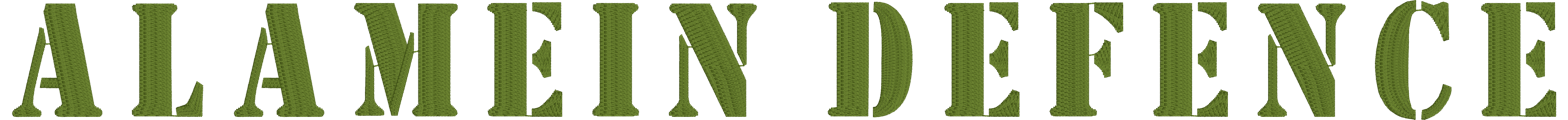

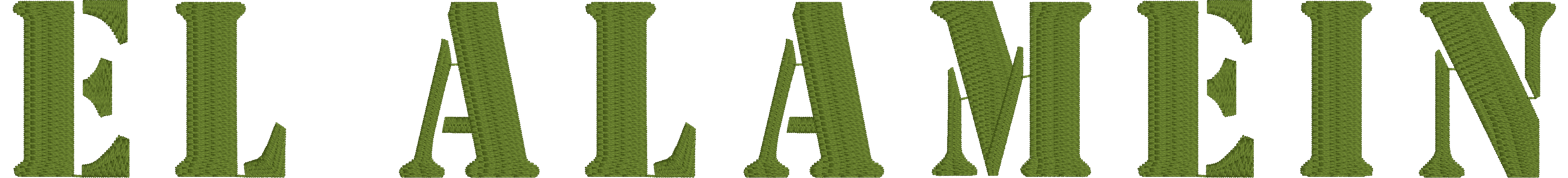

Commanders
- Current commander: Lt Col Takalani Mphohoni

Insignia
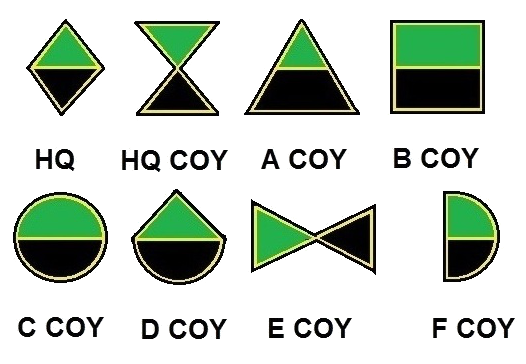
- Company level Insignia

- SA Motorised Infantry beret bar circa 1992: SA Motorised Infantry beret bar
- Abbreviation: MAPR

The Mapungubwe Regiment (formerly Regiment Christiaan Beyers) is a reserve infantry regiment of the South African Army. It traces its history as far back as 1939, and fought in the Second World War, and the Border War after 1966. It was renamed in August 2019.

== History ==
=== Origin ===
The regiment formed in 1939 as a second battalion of Regiment Botha. Regiment Botha was formed a few years earlier in 1934.

=== World War 2 ===
Known as Second Botha Regiment or the Second Bothas, it underwent a number of name changes during the Second World War. In 1942 it was called Regiment Botha and in 1943 it was joined to Regiment President Steyn. During the war, the regiment was part of the 5th South African Brigade and took part in the East African campaign and then later in the western deserts of Egypt and Libya.

=== Numerous names after World War Two and into the Border War ===
By 1946 it was called 59 Reserve Motor Service Company. In 1947 its name became 2 Regiment Botha.

By 1951 it became Regiment Christiaan Beyers.

By 1964 It was renamed Regiment Limpopo.

Finally in the Late 1960s it reverted to Regiment Christiaan Beyers again.

During the South African Border War, 1966-1989, this citizen force regiment was regularly deployed for duties in the Republic as well as South West Africa.

=== Post 1994 ===
The unit has taken part in peacekeeping duties in Southern Sudan and duties on the Swaziland border.

On the 29 November 2013, the regiment received the freedom of the city of Polokwane. The regiment paraded through the city before having the scroll presented by the Mayor Freddy Greaver to the officer in command Lt Colonel Takalani Mphohoni.

In August 2019, 52 Reserve Force units had their names changed to reflect the diverse military history of South Africa. Regiment Christiaan Beyers became the Mapungubwe Regiment, and have 3 years to design and implement new regimental insignia.

== SANDF's Motorised Infantry ==
SANDF’s Motorised Infantry is transported mostly by Samil trucks, Mamba APC’s or other un-protected motor vehicles. Samil 20,50 and 100 trucks transport soldiers, towing guns, and carrying equipment and supplies. Samil trucks are all-wheel drive, in order to have vehicles that function reliably in extremes of weather and terrain. Motorised infantry have an advantage in mobility allowing them to move to critical sectors of the battlefield faster, allowing better response to enemy movements, as well as the ability to outmaneuver the enemy.

== Regimental symbols ==
=== Previous Dress Insignia ===
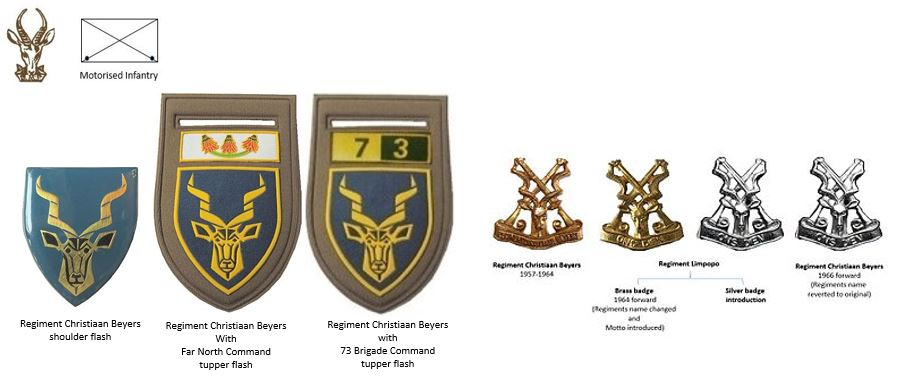
SADF era Regiment Christiaan Beyers insignia

=== Current Dress Insignia ===
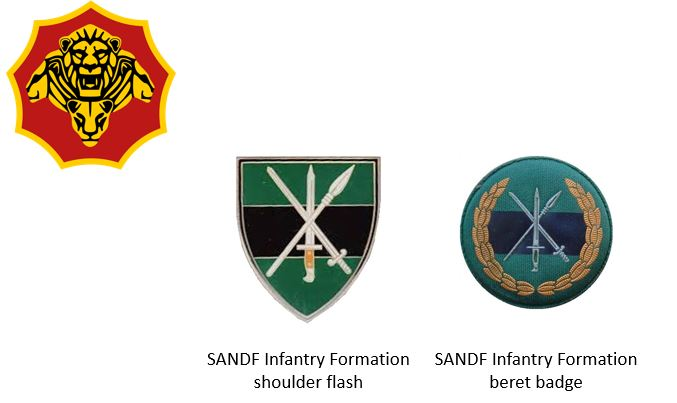
SANDF era Infantry Formation insignia

== Unit colours ==
The unit has three sets of colours:

- the first is preserved by the MOTH in Pietersburg,
- second unit colours were presented by General Rudolph Hiemstra in 1970,
- a third national colour was presented by General Kat Liebenberg in 1989.

== Battle honours ==
Battle Honours
Awarded to the Mapungubwe Regiment
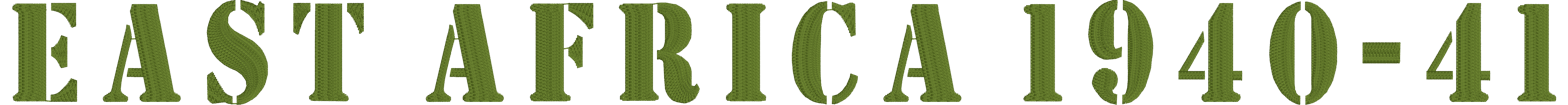
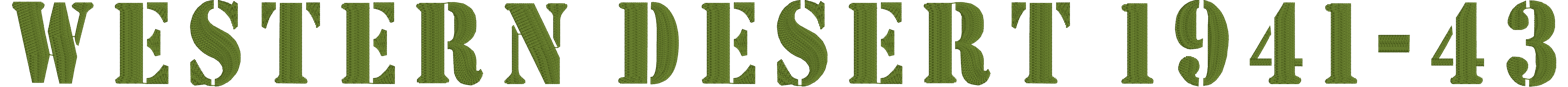
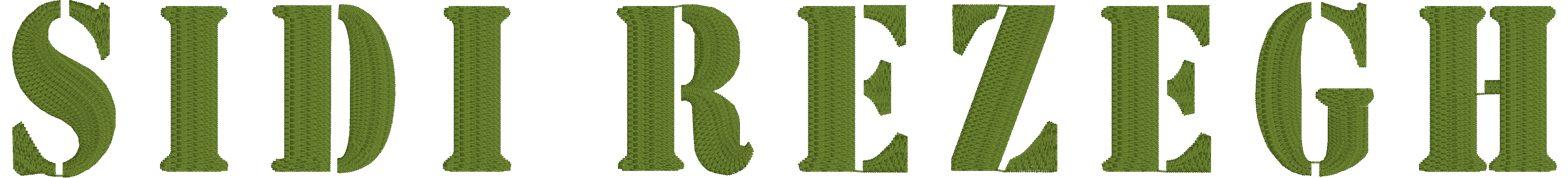
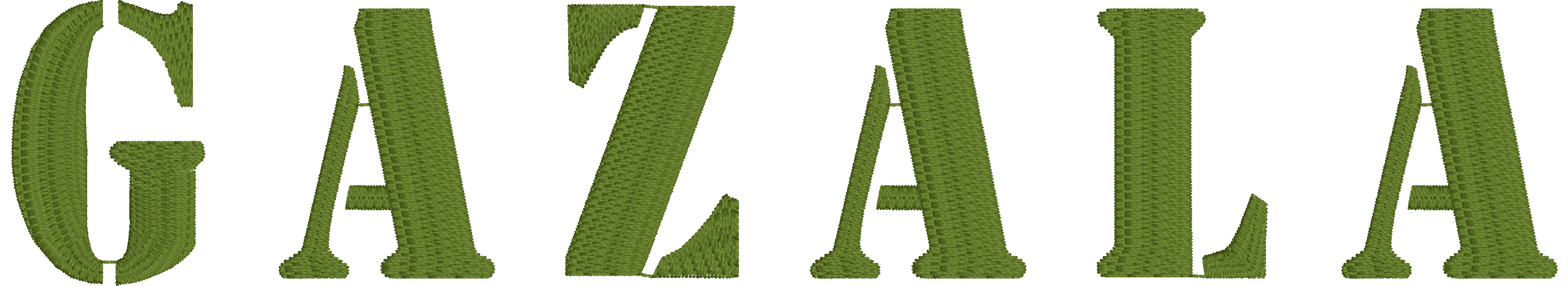
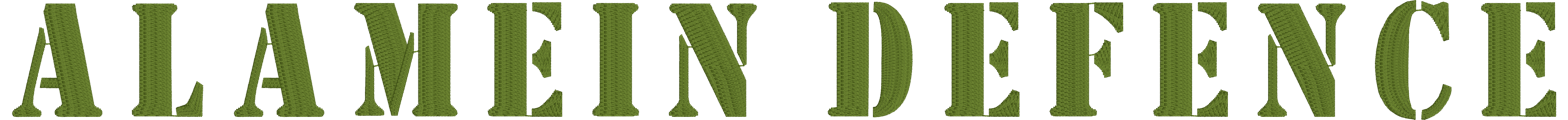
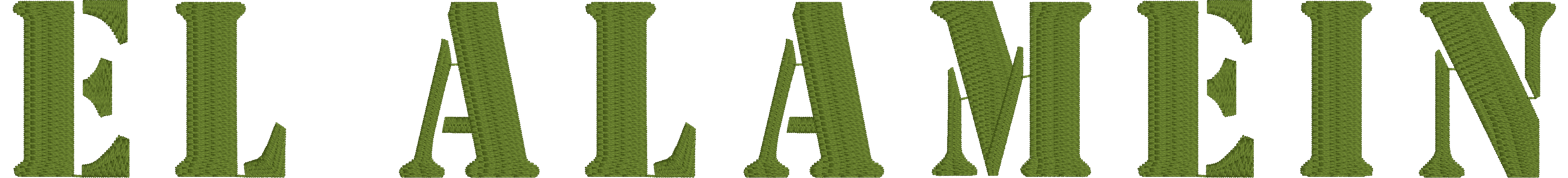

- East Africa
- Sidi Rezegh
- Gazala
- Battle of Alamein
- El Alamein Defence
- Western Desert
