= General Dan Pienaar Artillery Regiment =

Free State Artillery Corps Vrystaatse Artillerie Regiment General Dan Pienaar Artillery Regiment
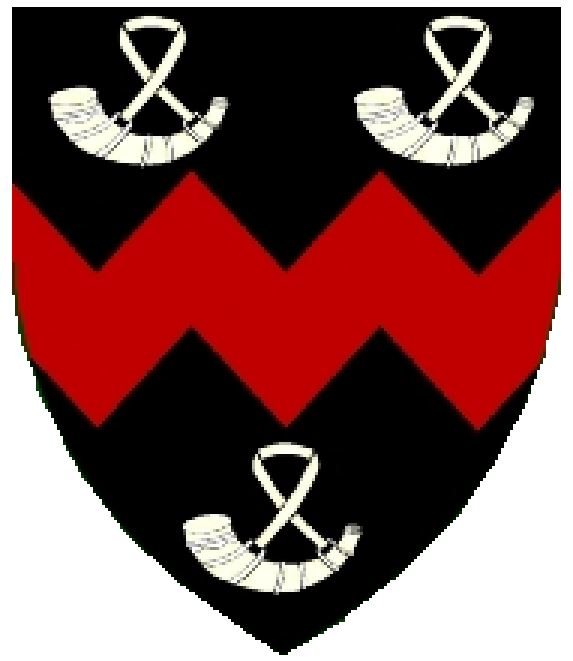
- SANDF Vrystaatse Artillerie Regiment emblem
- Active: 1854 to present
- Country: South Africa
- Allegiance: Republic of South Africa; Republic of South Africa
- Branch: South African Army; South African Army
- Type: Reserve Artillery
- Part of: South African Army Artillery Formation; Army Conventional Reserve
- Garrison/HQ: Kroonstad
- Motto: Aequo Animo Ac Virtute " Power gives peace of mind"
- Battle honours: Anglo-Boer War 1899-1902; Tobruk; El-Alamein; South-West Africa

Insignia
- Collar Badge: Bursting grenade with seven flames
- Beret Colour: Oxford Blue
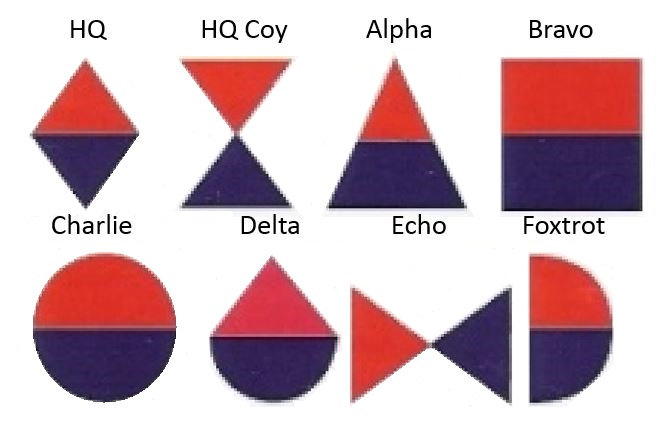
- Artillery Battery Emblems

- Artillery Beret Bar circa 1992
- Abbreviation: GDPR

The General Dan Pienaar Artillery Regiment (formerly the Vrystaatse Artillerie Regiment) is a reserve artillery regiment of the South African Army.

== History ==
=== Origin ===
==== The First Regiment ====
In 1854 the Free-State became an independent Republic. The British forces withdrew, leaving behind four 9-pounder garrison guns in the Queen's Fort in Bloemfontein. This was for many years the only ordnance the Free State Republic had.

The Free State Artillery Corps was subsequently founded in 1864 on a request by President Johannes Henricus Brand and housed in Queen's Fort.

===== Anglo Boer War =====
By the outbreak of the Anglo-Boer War, the corps was commanded by Major Richard Friedrich Wilhelm Albrecht. The unit (in 1898 some 160 men, 24 cannons of various calibers) served on the Western front, Natal front and into the Guerrilla phase of the War. The unit played a major role in every major battle of the war where Free State forces fought.

==== The Second Regiment ====
In 1922, 3 Permanent Battery was formed. This unit was split up on 1 July 1926 into two units namely 4 Burgher Battery and 5 Burgher Battery.

In 1932 these two were renamed 1 Oranje-Vrystaat Veldartillerie and 2 Oranje Vrystaat Veldartillerie.

===== World War 2 =====
On 1 February 1940 these units were joined as 12th Field Battery and saw service in Egypt. They took heavy casualties at Tobruk and El-Alamein.

On 18 April 1946 the unit was renamed 6 Field Artillery Regiment.

=== Post WW 2 ===
Vrystaatse Artillerie Regiment was based at Tempe, Bloemfontein, but relocated to Kroonstad in 2007. The relocation coincided with the revitalization of the unit through the joining of Army Territorial Reserve members with the closing of the Commandos.

=== President Nelson Mandela ===
On Freedom Day of 1997 (27 April) in Upington, Northern Cape, South Africa, a Battery from the regiment rendered a 21-gun salute in honour of President Nelson Mandela, who delivered his address during the celebration ceremony.

=== Name Change ===
In August 2019, 52 SA Army Reserve Force units had their names changed to reflect the diverse military history of South Africa. The Vrystaatse Artillerie Regiment became the General Dan Pienaar Artillery Regiment, and were given 3 years to design and implement new regimental insignia.

The current honorific is a remembrance of Major General Dan Pienaar, who served in both World Wars and was more known as commander of the 1st South African Infantry Division, which served the Allied forces and was part of the victorious forces that took part in the Second Battle of El Alamein (October 1942).

== Battle honours ==
- Anglo-Boer War 1899-1902
- Tobruk
- El-Alamein
- South-West Africa

== Officers Commanding ==
- 1991-1997 Lt Col Paul H. Fick
- 1986-1991 Cmdt Danie Acker
- 1984-1986 Cmdt Gerhard Groenewoud
- 1979-1984 Cmdt Chris Biel
- 1974-1978 Cmdt BC Stevens
- 2007 - 2009 Lt Col Botha
- 2009 - 2014 Maj Smart
- 2014 - 2019 Maj Scheurkogel

== RSM ==
2007–Present MWO H.Beyers

1976-- AO1. JF Geringer.

(Three months Angola border bush war)

== Freedom of the city ==
Bloemfontein

2012 Ladysmith

== Insignia ==
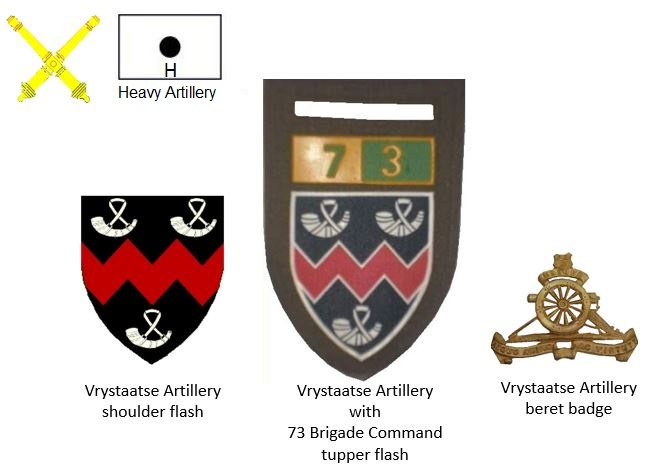
SADF era Vrystaatse Artillery insignia

== Bibliography ==
- Ultima Ratio Regum; the Artillery History of South-Africa, South-African Army Information Bureau 1987
- Swemmer D, Die Geskiedenis van die Vrystaatse Artillerie, Unpublished Manuscript, 1946
- Barnard, S.L.(ed) van der Westhuizen, G. Smit, L. Vrystaatse Artillerie: Die Geskiedenis van 6 Veldregiment
