= Regiment Skoonspruit =

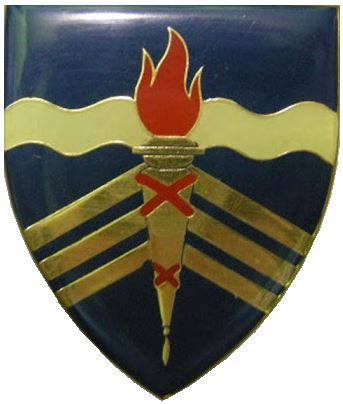
- Regiment Skoonspruit emblem
- Active: 1966 – 1999
- Disbanded: July 1999
- Country: South Africa
- Allegiance: Republic of South Africa; Republic of South Africa
- Branch: South African Army; South African Army
- Type: Infantry
- Role: Motorised Infantry
- Size: One Battalion
- Part of: South African Infantry Corps; Army Conventional Reserve
- Garrison/HQ: Orkney, North West Province
- Mottos: Robore et Vigilantia (Strength and vigilance)

Commanders
- First OC: Commandant Kruger

Regiment Skoonspruit was a motorised infantry regiment of the South African Army. It formed part of the South African Army Infantry Formation. As a reserve unit, it had a status roughly equivalent to that of a present-day British Army Reserve or United States Army National Guard unit.

== History ==
=== Origin ===
This Regiment was formed in 1966.

=== Operations ===
The regiment was deployed to the Kaokoveld in 1981 seeing action against SWAPO/PLAN insurgents. A member was killed by an enemy rifle grenade.

=== Disbandment ===
The unit was disbanded in 1999.

== Insignia ==
=== Dress Insignia ===
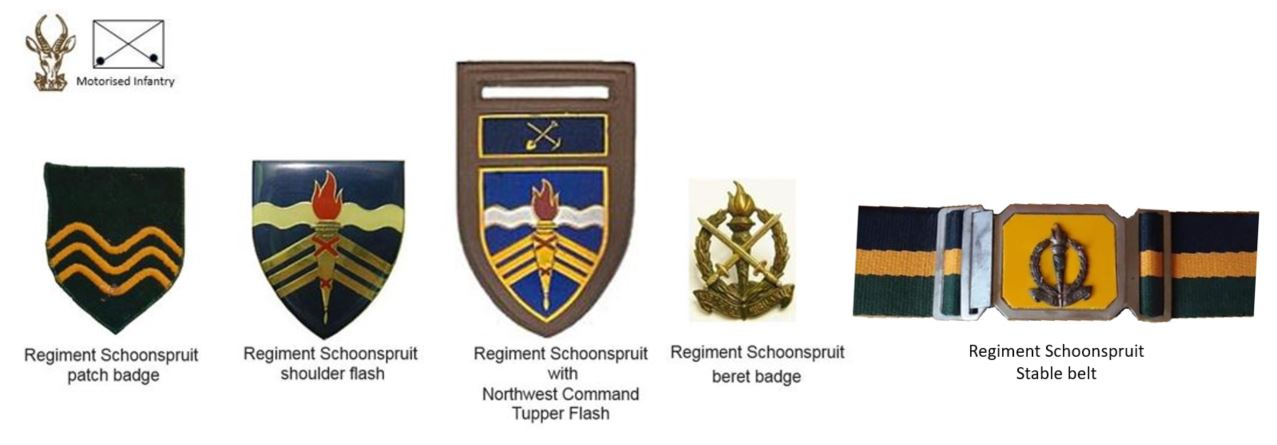
SADF era Regiment Schoonspruit insignia

=== Leadership ===
Leadership
From	Honorary Colonels	To	Ribbon
	No known incumbents		
From	Commanding Officers	To	Ribbon
nd	Cmdt Kruger	nd	
nd	Cmdt Roodt	nd	
nd	Cmdt Jacobs	nd	
nd	Lt Col onel Campher	nd	
From	Regimental Sergeants Major	To	Ribbon
	No known incumbents		
