= 43 South African Brigade =

43 SA Brigade
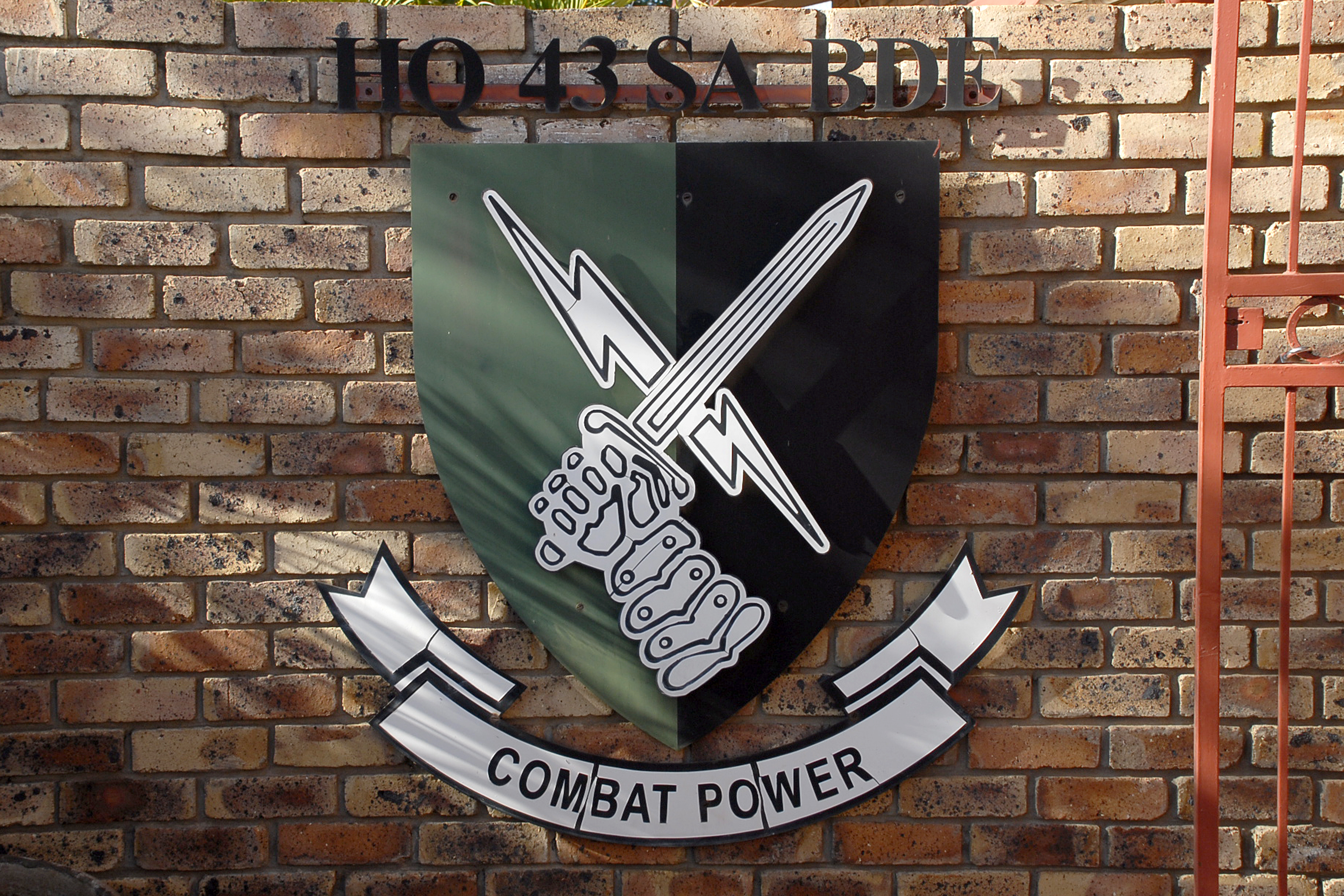
- Active: 2 April 1997–present
- Country: South Africa
- Branch: South African Army
- Role: To provide a combat ready Brigade Headquarters for the employment by CSANDF as required.
- Part of: Chief of Army (administrative); HQ SANDF (operational)
- Motto: Combat Power
- Colors: Green and Black

Insignia
- Emblem: Mechanised Infantry Fist

43 South African Brigade is a formation of the South African Army. It was established on 2 April 1997 at Wallmannsthal, Gauteng as 43 Mechanised Brigade and then changed to 43 South African Brigade in 1999. Administratively, the headquarters answers to the Chief of the Army. Operationally and for force training, the formation takes instructions from the Joint Operations Division. Units and subunits are attached as required for the task at hand. When not required, those units remain part of their respective type formations.

== History ==
The history of the brigade dates back to the late 1990s when HQ 43 Mechanised Brigade HQ provided the Headquarters of the Combined SADC Task Force and commanded the intervention stage of Operation Boleas in Lesotho in September 1998.

In 2009 43 SA Brigade provided the Military Component Force HQ for the SADC Standby Force during Exercise GOLFINHO.

== Mandate ==
Its mandate is: "To provide combat-ready land forces for the pursuance of national defence and the prevention of war, failing which, to jointly and preferably multinationally, swiftly and decisively achieve national security goals and collaboratively promoting peace and stability internally and externally in concurrence with international obligations to contribute to the development and upliftment of South Africa, its people and the African continent."

== Insignia ==
=== Dress Insignia ===
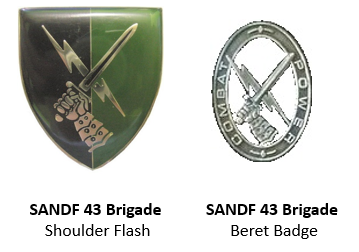
SANDF 43 Brigade insignia

== Leadership ==
General Officers Commanding
From	43 South African Brigade	To	Ribbon
1997	Col Robbie Hartslief	1998	
1998	Brig Vusi Sindane	2001	
2002	Brigadier General Dumisani Mdtutyana	2005	
c. 2005	Brigadier General Lawrence Smith	2014	
2015	Brigadier General Xolani Mankayi	Incumbent	
