= 121 South African Infantry Battalion =

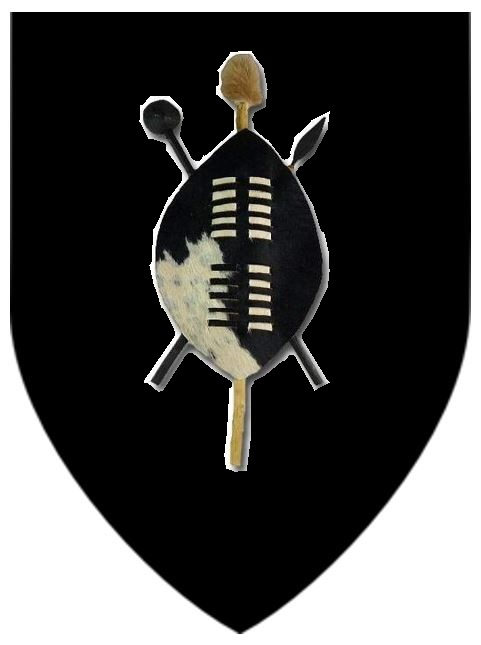
- 121 SAI emblem
- Active: 1979 to present
- Country: South Africa
- Branch: South African Army
- Type: Motorised infantry
- Part of: South African Infantry Formation
- Garrison/HQ: Mtubatuba, KwaZulu-Natal
- Engagements: South African Border War

Insignia
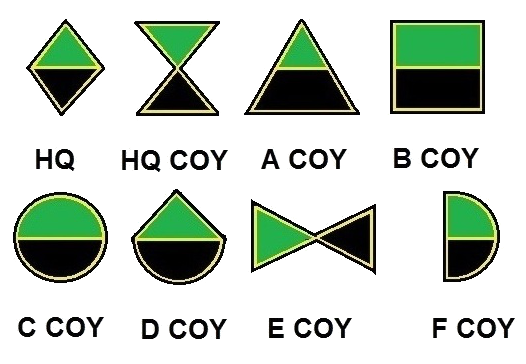
- Company level insignia

121 South African Infantry Battalion is a motorised infantry unit of the South African Army.

== History ==
=== Origin ===
A decision was made around 1979 to develop a Zulu speaking infantry battalion. On 20 January men who had reported for duty at the Jozini Base were sent to 21 SAI Battalion at Lenz (near Johannesburg) where 79 men completed training.

=== Garrison ===
On 23 April 1979, 121 SAI Battalion was established and allocated lines near an old Water Affairs compound at Jozini. By 1980, a platoon of 121 SAI Battalion was despatched for duty in South West Africa (Namibia).

By 1981, 121 SAI Battalion was relocated to a new base at Dukuduku where the leopard head was adopted as the beret badge. 121 SAI Battalion received its national colours in 1989.

Freedom of the City was issued to 121 SAI Battalion by:

- uMhlanga in 1989 and
- Mtubatuba in 1994

== SANDF's Motorised Infantry ==
SANDF's Motorised Infantry is transported mostly by Mamba Mk3 Armoured Personnel Carriers, SAMIL Trucks, or other un-protected motor vehicles. SAMIL 20, SAMIL 50 and SAMIL 100 trucks transport soldiers, towing guns, and carrying equipment and supplies. SAMIL trucks are 2x4 and 4x6 drive, in order to have vehicles that function reliably in extremes of weather and terrain. Motorised infantry have an advantage in mobility allowing them to move to critical sectors of the battlefield faster, allowing better response to enemy movements, as well as the ability to outmaneuver the enemy.

== Leadership ==
Leadership
From	Honorary Colonel	To	Ribbon
	No known incumbents		
From	Officer Commanding	To	Ribbon
1981	Maj E. Pretorius	nd	
1982	Cmdt J. Quinn	1984	
1984	Cmdt J.J. Lotheringen	1989	
1990	Cmdt P. Smythe	1992	
From	Regimental Sergeants Major	To	Ribbon
	No known incumbents		

== Insignia ==
=== Previous Dress Insignia ===
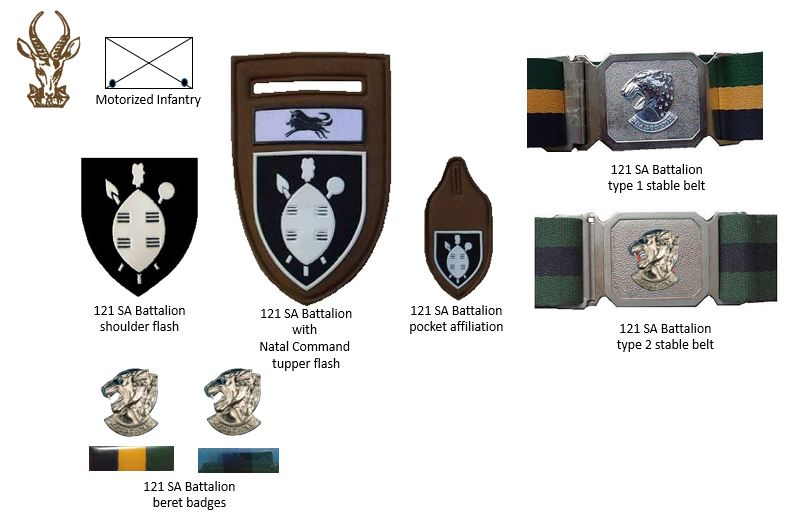
SADF era 121 Battalion insignia

=== Current Dress Insignia ===
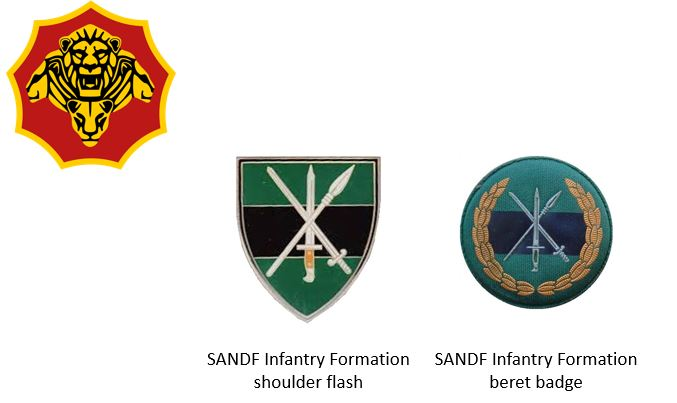
SANDF era Infantry Formation insignia
