= 5 South African Infantry Battalion =

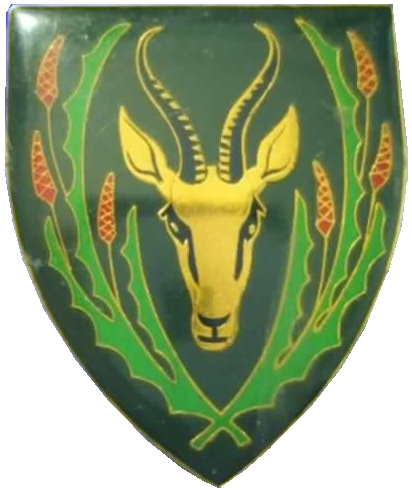
- 5 SAI emblem
- Active: 1 January 1962 to present
- Country: South Africa
- Branch: South African Army
- Type: Motorised infantry
Part of
South African Army Infantry Formation
- Garrison/HQ: Ladysmith, KwaZulu-Natal
- Motto: Avante!
- Equipment: Mamba APC
- Engagements: South African Border War

Insignia
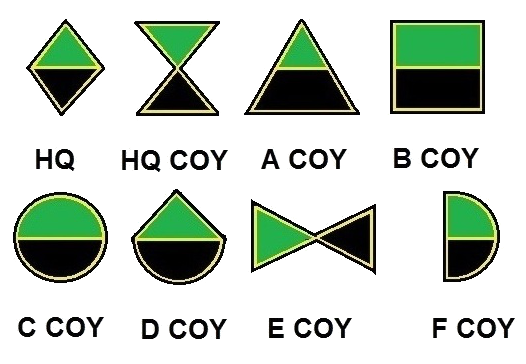
- Company level insignia

- SA Motorised Infantry beret bar circa 1992: SA Motorised Infantry beret bar

5 South African Infantry Battalion is a motorised infantry unit of the South African Army.

== History ==
=== Based in Ladysmith ===
5 SAI was established on 1 January 1962, at Ladysmith, Natal Province. The battalion became operational on 1 April 1962.

=== The Insizwa Proficiency ===
5 SAI had a very unusual proficiency in the 1970s and 1980s, called the Insizwa, the Zulu word for a strong young man. The criteria required that only sharpshooters on a table 4 level were allowed to compete. A 2.4 kilometres (1.5 mi) run had to be done under ten minutes with battle kit on, followed by 20 kilometres (12 mi) route march also with battle kit. The route march would end at the 200 metres (220 yd) firing line where the competitor would have to shoot 8 shots in the bull. The soldier would also have to successfully complete all other shooting exercises with an 80% success rate.

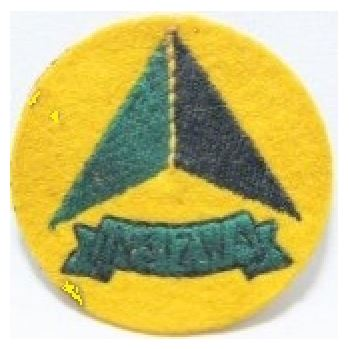
SADF 5 SAI Insizwa proficiency

=== Bushwar ===
5 SAI took part in Operation Savannah during 1975 in Angola, and Operation Protea in 1981 where it deployed companies continuously on rotation to the operational area, taking part in many of the large operations across the border into Angola in the years which followed, right up to the withdrawal of South African forces from Namibia in 1989.

=== Training Area ===
Land to the east of Ladysmith was allocated by the Department of Defence in 1990 as the Boschhoek Training Area.

=== Peacekeeping operations ===
In 2004, the battalion was one of several South African units who took part as peacekeepers in the United Nations Mission to the Democratic Republic of Congo (MONUC). The battalion was deployed again in May 2014 to the eastern Democratic Republic of Congo as part of the United Nations Force Intervention Brigade.

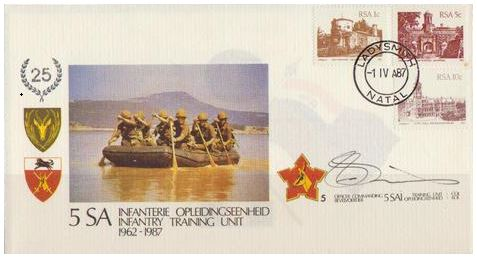
SADF 5 SAI Commemorative letter

== SANDF's Motorised Infantry ==
SANDF's Motorised Infantry is transported mostly by SAMIL Trucks, Mamba APC's or other un-protected motor vehicles. SAMIL 20, SAMIL 50 and SAMIL 100 trucks transport soldiers, towing guns, and carrying equipment and supplies. Samil trucks are all-wheel drive, in order to have vehicles that function reliably in extremes of weather and terrain. Motorised infantry have an advantage in mobility allowing them to move to critical sectors of the battlefield faster, allowing better response to enemy movements, as well as the ability to outmaneuver the enemy.

== Insignia ==
=== Previous Dress Insignia ===
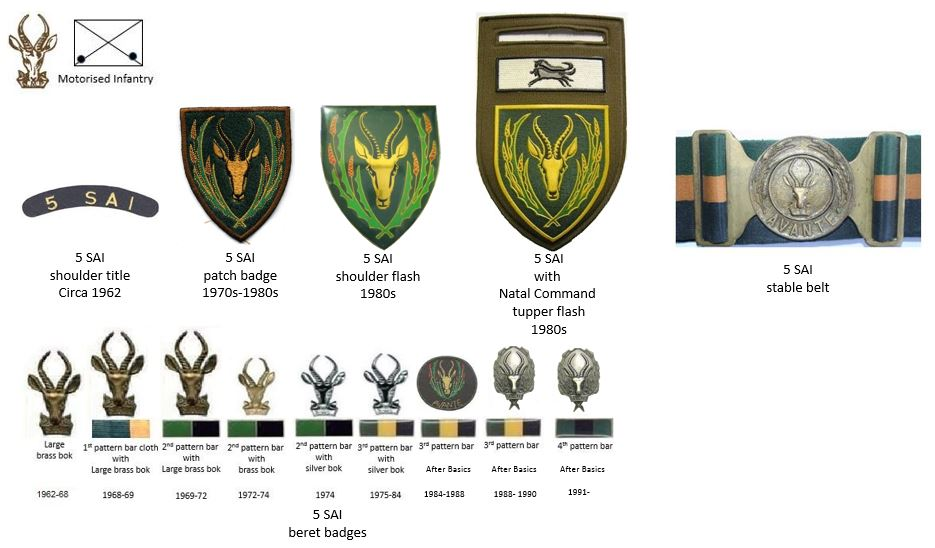
SADF era 5 SAI insignia

=== Current Dress Insignia ===
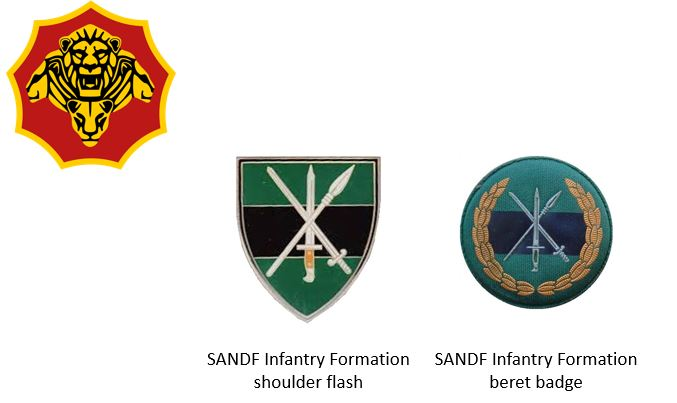
SANDF era Infantry Formation insignia

== Leadership ==
Leadership of 5 South African Infantry Battalion
From	Commanding Officers	To	Ribbon
1962-04-01	Cmdt M.N. Horner	1963-07-30	
1963-08-01	Cmdt H.K.J. Van Noorden SM	1966-09-28	Southern Cross Medal SM
1966-09-29	Cmdt J. Marshall MC	1968-08-07	Military Cross MC
1968-08-08	Col M.N. Horner	1968-09-15	
1968-09-16	Cmdt J.P.F. Botha	1970-06-24	
1970-06-25	Cmdt G.P.H. Kruys SM	1973-08-16	Southern Cross Medal SM
1973-08-17	Cmdt L.C. vd B. Heap	1975-03-31	
1975-04-01	Cmdt A.J.M. Joubert	1976-12-01	
1976-12-02	Cmdt D. C. Benade	1977-12-30	
1977-12-31	Cmdt T.J. Van Schalkwyk	1981-01-02	
1981-01-03	Cmdt K.V. Harris	1983-12-31	
1984-01-01	Col K.V. Harris	1986-12-31	
1987-01-01	Col M.S. Smuts	1989-12-31	
1990-01-01	Col J.B. Pieterse	1992-12-31	
1993-01-01	Col P.M. Smythe MMM	1995-05-05	Military Merit Medal MMM
1995-05-06	Col S.P. Zeeman MMM	2000-08-04	Military Merit Medal MMM
2000-08-05	Lt Col V.E. White	2004-12-31	
2005-01-01	Lt Col N.P. Bobelo	2007-12-31	
2008-01-01	Lt Col C. Els	2011-10-23	
2011-10-24	Lt Col S.T. Hloka	c. 2013	
c. 2013	Lt Col N.M. Zama	2014	
From	Regimental Sgts Major	To	Ribbon
1962	WO1 B.R. Kruger	1963	
1964	WO1 C. van der Merwe	1964	
1965	WO1 A.A. Calmeyer	1968	
1968	WO1 N.G. Rust	1969	
1969	WO1 P.J.C. Badenhorst	1975	
1975	WO1 E.J. Nel	1979	
1979	WO1 B.C. Oosthuizen	nd	
