= 2 South African Infantry Battalion =

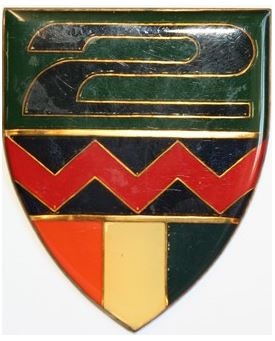
- 2 SAI emblem
- Active: 1 January 1962 to present
- Country: South Africa
- Branch: South African Army
- Type: Motorised infantry
- Part of: South African Infantry Formation
- Garrison/HQ: Walvis Bay previous Zeerust
- Motto: In Utrumque Paratus (Prepared for all situations)
- Engagements: South African Border War
- Battle honours: Angola 1975

Insignia
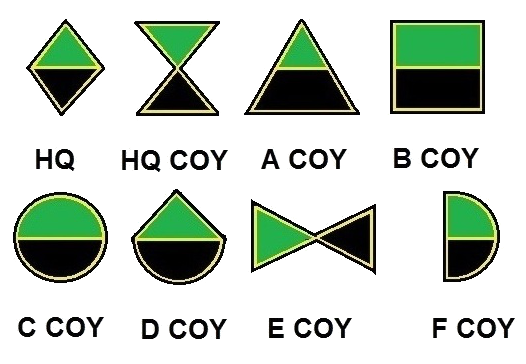
- Company level insignia

- SA Motorised Infantry beret bar circa 1992: SA Motorised Infantry beret bar

2 South African Infantry Battalion is a motorised infantry unit of the South African Army.

== History ==
=== Origin: Walvis Bay and South West Africa ===
2 SAI was established on 1 January 1962, at Walvis Bay an enclave of South Africa surrounded by South-West Africa (Namibia). The first officer to command the battalion was Major G.N. Mcloughlin and the first RSM was WO1 J.A.J. Steenkamp. Initially the base consisted of tents, but was later replaced by prefabricated buildings. Basic training took place in the desert and running up Dune 7 became part of that regime.

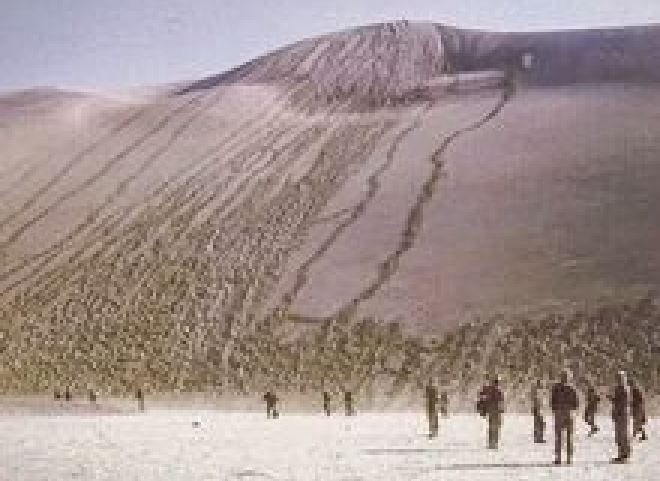
SADF 2 SAI exercise on Dune 7

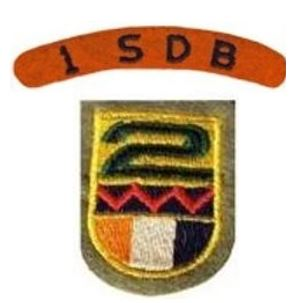
SADF era 1 SSB D Squadron with 2 SAI insignia

=== Units Colours ===
The unit was awarded its colours by the local municipality in 1969, and adopted the town's motto and flamingo emblem as a consequence.

=== Freedom of Walvis Bay ===
On 30 August 1974, the freedom of Walvis Bay was granted to 2 SAI.

==== Mechanised Battlegroup ====
While at Walvis Bay, 2 SAI was organised as a battlegroup when on 1 October 1973, an armoured car subunit, D Squadron, from 1 Special Service Battalion's became a part of 2 SSB and subsequently 2 SAI.

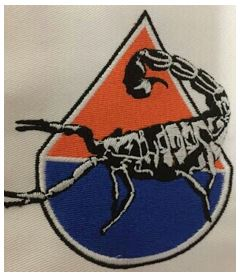
Delta Armoured Squadron with 2 SAI

An artillery battery, 43 Field Battery, was also added.

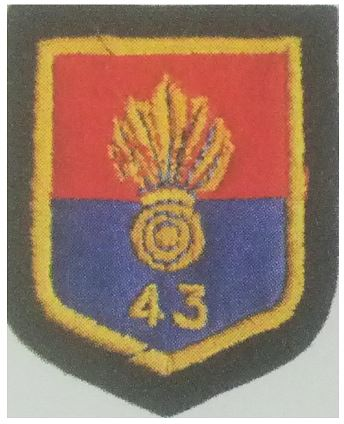
43 Field Artillery with 2 SAI

This accounts for the unit insignia including at the top the number "2" in infantry colours, with the St Barbara's lightning flash representing the artillery in the middle and armour's old heraldic colours at the bottom.

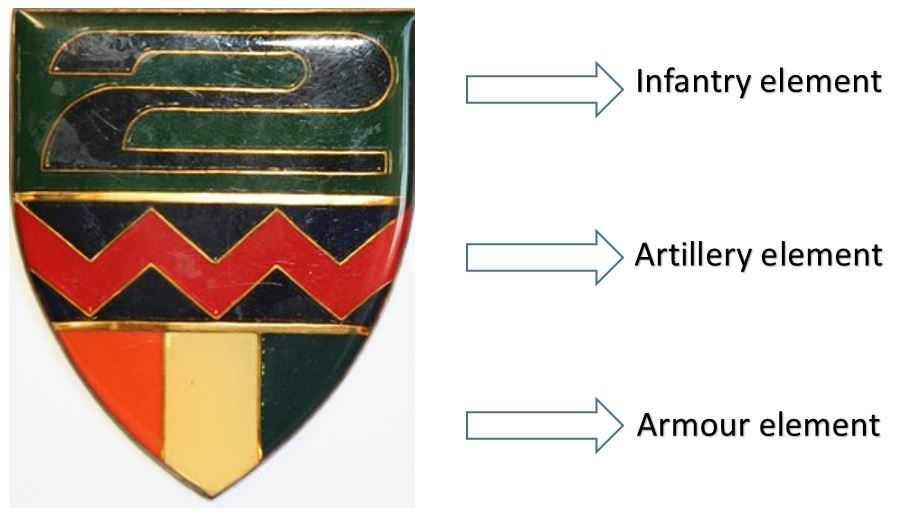
SADF 2 SAI Battalion Group elements

These elements and the Transport Park and quartermaster were based at Rooikop, a distance inland because of the rust at the coast.

=== Training the fledgling SWATF ===
Since 1981, national servicemen of the SWA Territorial Force were also trained by the battalion.

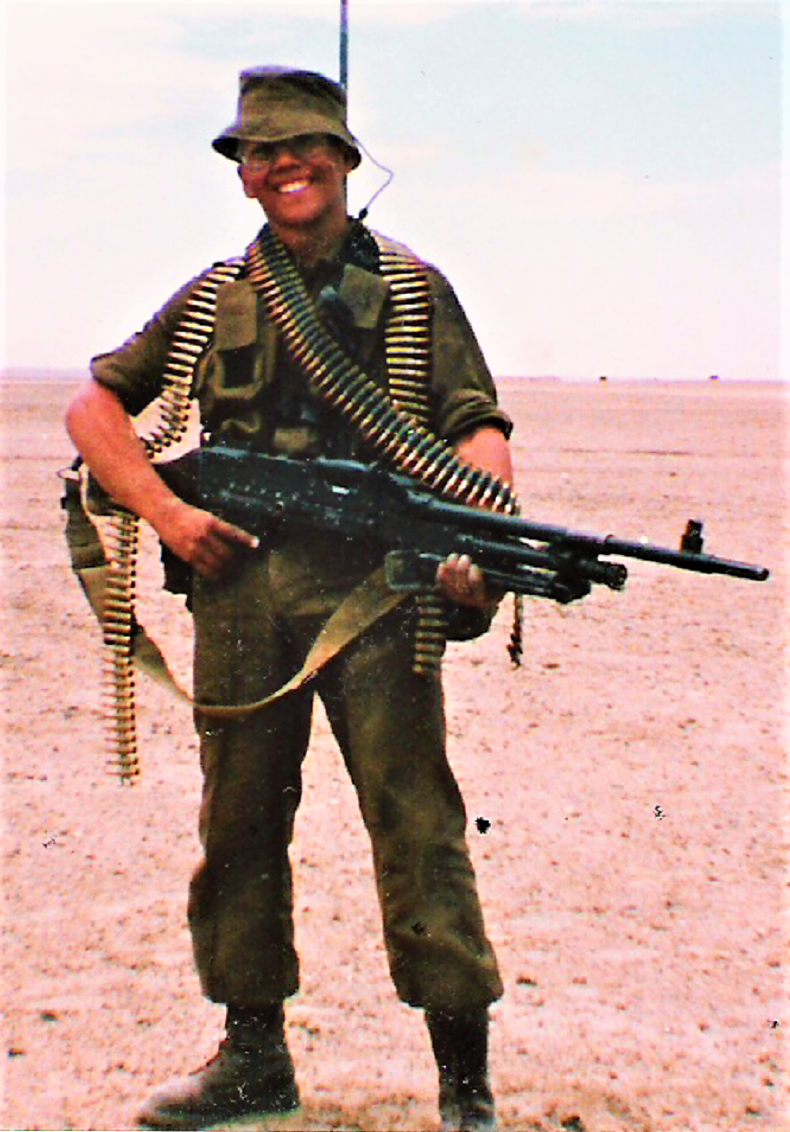
National Serviceman at Swartkoppies training area in 1987

=== Operations ===
2 SAI first saw deployment to the South-West Africa/Angola border in 1968.

2 SAI took part in Operation Savannah during 1975, when South African troops covertly involved themselves in the Angolan Civil War.

=== Disbandment ===
The unit disbanded at the end of 1989 when Namibia gained independence.

=== Reactivation in South Africa ===
==== Pomfret, South Africa ====
On 1 July 1993, the unit was reformed at Pomfret from old members of 32 Battalion, it then resorted under Northern Cape Command.

==== Zeerust, South Africa ====
By 1998, the unit was transferred to North West Command and then based in Zeerust.

=== 2 SAI today: SANDF Motorised Infantry ===
On its reactivation back in South Africa, 2 SAI was transformed into a motorised infantry unit using mostly SAMIL Trucks, Mamba APC's or other un-protected motor vehicles. SAMIL 20, SAMIL 50 and SAMIL 100 trucks transport soldiers, towing guns, and carrying equipment and supplies. Samil trucks are all-wheel drive, in order to have vehicles that function reliably in extremes of weather and terrain. Motorised Infantry have an advantage in mobility allowing them to move to critical sectors of the battlefield faster, allowing better response to enemy movements, as well as the ability to outmanoeuvre the enemy.

== Leadership ==
Leadership
From	Honorary Colonel	To	Ribbon
	No known incumbents		
From	Officer Commanding	To	Ribbon
1962	Maj G.N. McLoughlin	c. 1964	
1964	Cmdt J.S. Haupt	c. 1964	
1965	Cmdt A.J. van Deventer	c. 1968	
1968	Cmdt C.F. Vermeulen	c. 1970	
1970	Cmdt A. Potgieter	c. 1971	
1971	Cmdt I.R. Gleeson SSAG,SD,SM (Note: Later Lieutenant General) (Note: Later Chief of Army Staff Operations, Chief of Staff Operations and Chief of the Defence Force Staff)	c. 1972	Star of South Africa SSAG Southern Cross Decoration SD Southern Cross Medal SM
1972	Cmdt D.S. du Toit	c. 1976	
1976	Cmdt W.G. Kritzinger SD,SM,MMM (Note: Later Officer Commanding South African Infantry School and Eastern Province Command, GOC Witwatersrand Command, and Chief of Staff Operations)	c. 1977	Southern Cross Decoration SD Southern Cross Medal SM Military Merit Medal MMM
1978	Cmdt J.L. Jordaan	c. 1980	
1980	Cmdt C.E. Le Roux	c. 1980	
1981	Cmdt F.J. van den Berg	c. 1982	
1983	Cmdt J. Coetzer	c. 1983	
1984	Cmdt J.M.R. van der Riet	c. 1986	
1987	Col T.J. van Schalkwyk	c. nd	
From	Regimental Sergeants Major	To	Ribbon
1962	WO1 J.A.J. Steenkamp	1965	
1965	WO1 P.J. Badenhorst	1970	
1970	WO1 P.H. Kieser	1970	
1970	WO1 J.J. Roberts	1972	
1972	WO1 J.H. Gagiano	1975	
1975	WO1 D.A. Vorster	1977	
1976	WO1 F.H. Smit	1981	
1981	WO1 S. Mew	1982	
1983	WO1 P.J. Steyn	1985	
1986	WO1 W.M. de Jager	nd	

== Insignia ==
=== Previous Dress Insignia ===
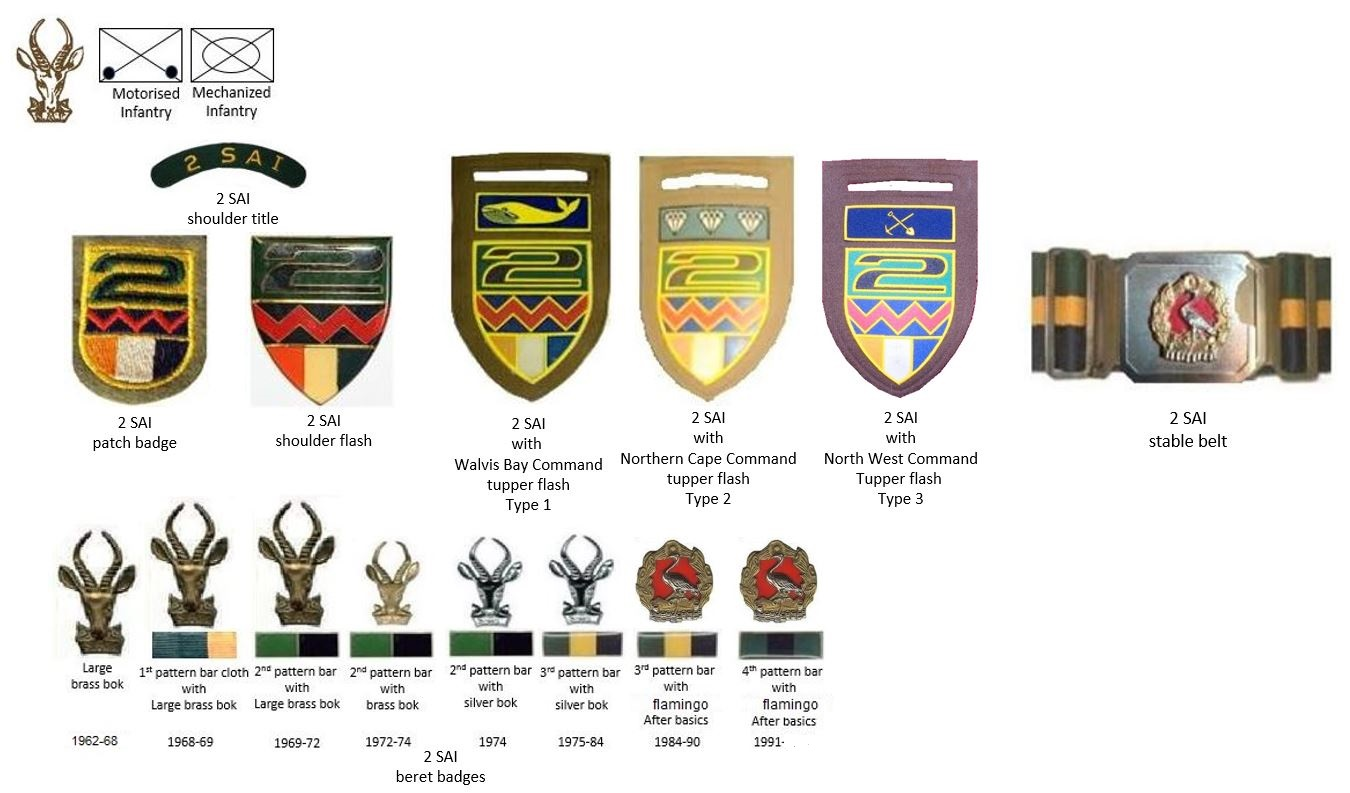
SADF era 2 SAI insignia

As a national servicemen at 2 SAI in 1975, I can categorically state that the beret badges for 1975 were small brass Springboks, without a bar underneath. The instructors still wore the large brass Springbok on their berets.

=== Current Dress Insignia ===
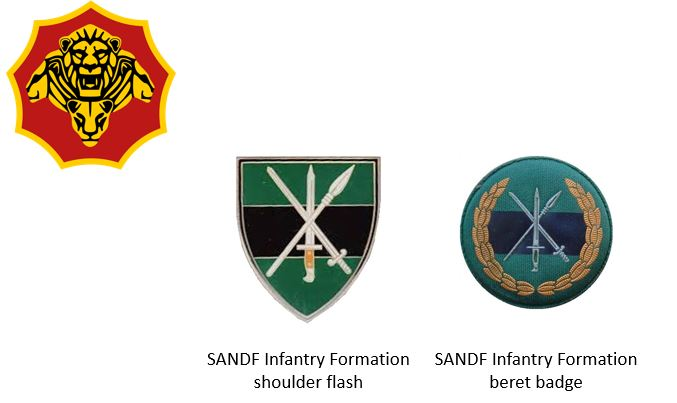
SANDF era Infantry Formation insignia
