= 10 South African Infantry Battalion =

Motorised infantry unit of the South African Army

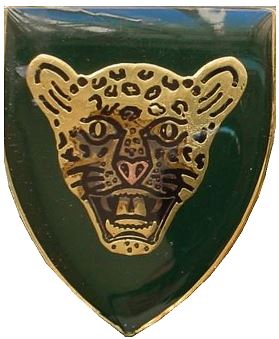
- 10 SAI emblem
- Active: 1 January 1994 to present
- Country: South Africa
- Branch: South African Army
- Type: Motorised infantry
- Part of: South African Army Infantry Formation
- Garrison/HQ: Mahikeng, Northwest Province
- Motto: Respice Finem!
- Equipment: Mamba APC

Insignia
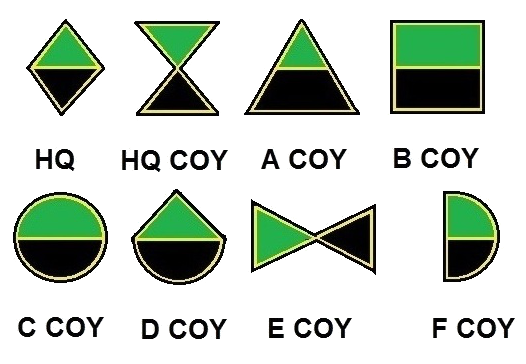
- Company level insignia

- Bophuthatswana Defence Force Beret Bar pre 1992

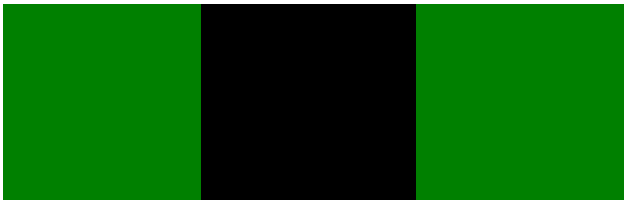
- SANDF type 2 Infantry Beret bar 1992 - 2003

10 South African Infantry Battalion is a motorised infantry unit of the South African Army. "Fact file: 10 SA Infantry Battalion". 2 March 2010.

== History ==
10 SAI Grundy, K.W. Soldiers without politics, Blacks in the South African Armed Forces, Perspectives on Southern Africa, 33, University of California Press, Berkeley. ISBN 0-520-04710-9 AACR2 was established on 1 January 1994, at Mahikeng, Northwest Province as a result of the amalgamation of infantry elements of the former Bophuthatswana Defence Force into the SANDF.

== SANDF's Motorised Infantry ==
SANDF's Motorised Infantry is transported mostly by SAMIL Trucks, Mamba Mk3 Armoured Personnel Carriers or other un-protected motor vehicles. SAMIL 20, SAMIL 50 and SAMIL 100 trucks transport soldiers, towing guns, and carrying equipment and supplies. SAMIL trucks are all-wheel drive, in order to have vehicles that function reliably in extremes of weather and terrain. Motorised infantry have an advantage in mobility allowing them to move to critical sectors of the battlefield faster, allowing better response to enemy movements, as well as the ability to outmaneuver the enemy.

== Leadership ==
Leadership
From	Officer Commanding	To	Ribbon
2015	Lt Col Charles Xapa	c. nd	
From	Regimental Sergeants Major	To	Ribbon
	No known incumbents		

== Insignia ==
=== Previous Dress Insignia ===
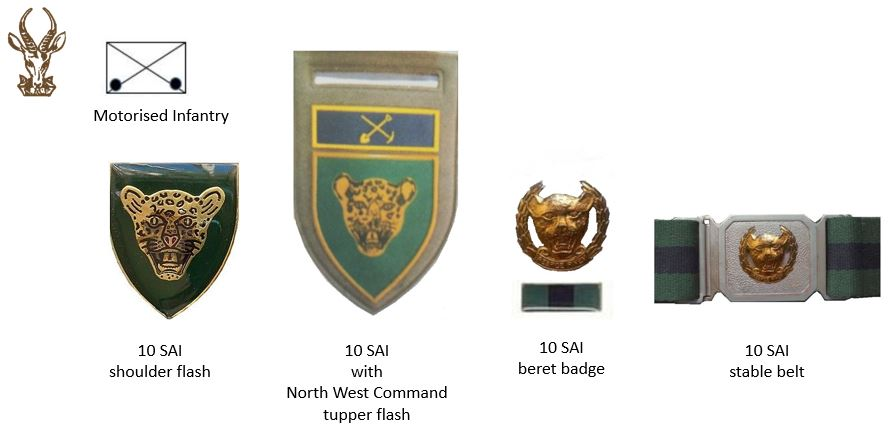
SANDF early era 10 SAI insignia

=== Current Dress Insignia ===
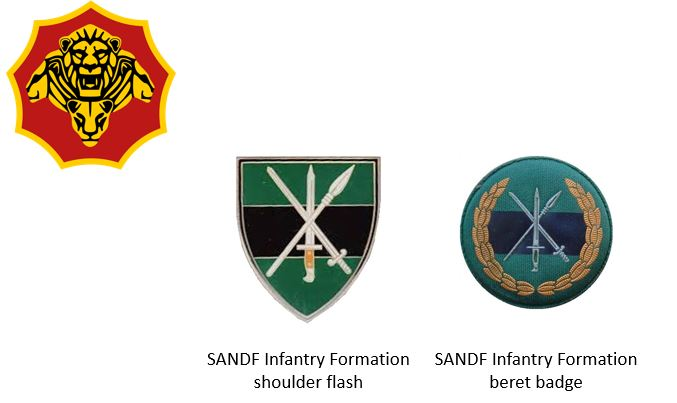
SANDF era Infantry Formation insignia
