= 15 South African Infantry Battalion =

15 South African Infantry Battalion.
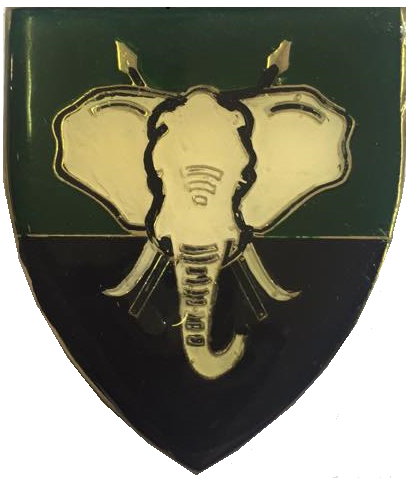
- 15 SAI emblem
- Active: 1994 to present
- Country: South Africa
- Branch: South African Army
- Type: Motorised infantry
- Part of: South African Infantry Formation
- Garrison/HQ: Thohoyandou, Limpopo
- Superimposed on a Western European-traditional-shape shield, top half green and bottom half black, an elephant's head.: Elephant

Insignia
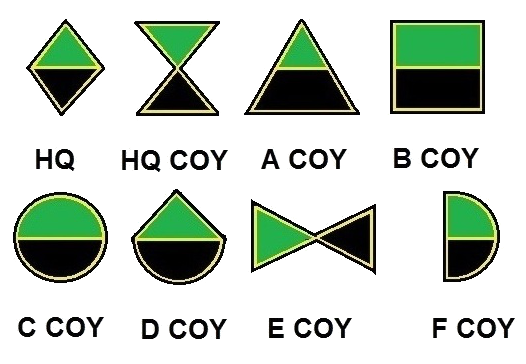
- Company level insignia

15 South African Infantry Battalion is a motorised infantry unit of the South African Army.

== History ==
=== Origin ===
This battalion was established in 1994 from the ranks of the former Venda Defence Force. The unit badge reflects its location. Thohoyandou means "head of the elephant".

=== Operational Command ===
The unit resorted for operational purposes under the command of the Soutpansberg Military Area.

== Insignia ==
=== Previous Dress Insignia ===
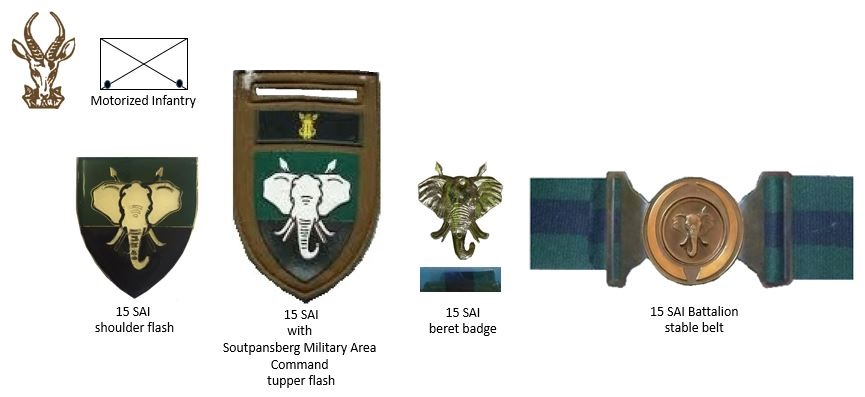
SANDF early era 15 SAI insignia

=== Current Dress Insignia ===
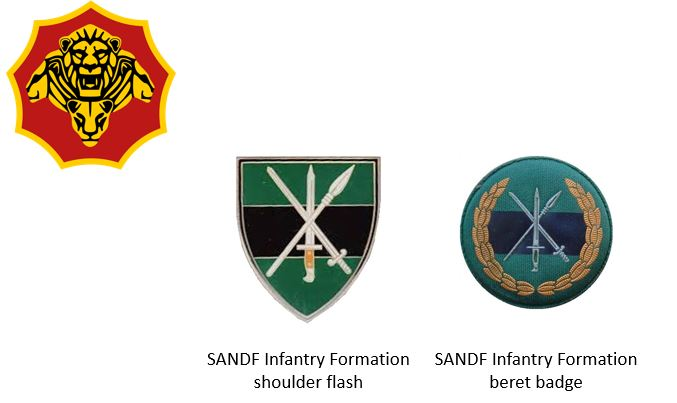
SANDF era Infantry Formation insignia

== SANDF's Motorised Infantry ==
SANDF's Motorised Infantry is transported mostly by SAMIL Trucks, Mamba Mk3 Armoured Personnel Carriers or other un-protected motor vehicles. SAMIL 20, SAMIL 50 and SAMIL 100 trucks transport soldiers, towing guns, and carrying equipment and supplies. Samil trucks are all-wheel drive, in order to have vehicles that function reliably in extremes of weather and terrain. Motorised infantry have an advantage in mobility allowing them to move to critical sectors of the battlefield faster, allowing better response to enemy movements, as well as the ability to outmaneuver the enemy.

== Leadership ==
Leadership
| From | Honorary Colonel | To | Ribbon |
|---|---|---|---|
| | No known incumbents | | |
| From | Officer Commanding | To | Ribbon |
| 2003 | Col Xolisa Poni | c. nd | |
| 2004 | Lt Col Johannes Foke | c. nd | |
| From | Regimental Sergeants Major | To | Ribbon |
| | No known incumbents | | |
