= 21 South African Infantry Battalion =

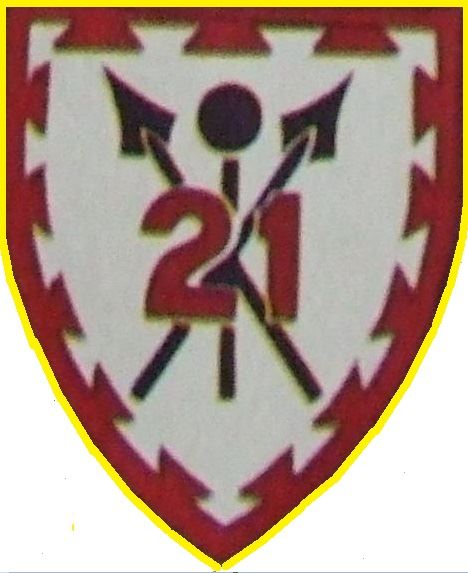
- 21 South African Infantry emblem
- Active: 1 January 1991
- Country: South Africa
- Branch: South African Army
- Type: Internal Stability
- Part of: South African Infantry Formation
- Garrison/HQ: Doornkop, Johannesburg
- Motto: Nostro operi fideles (Sure of our work)

Insignia
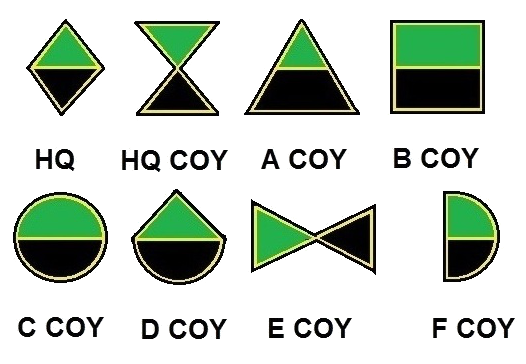
- Company level insignia

- SA Motorised Infantry beret bar circa 1992: SA Motorised Infantry beret bar

21 South African Infantry Battalion is an infantry battalion of the South African Army. The unit has its origin as 21 Battalion, an apartheid era unit used to train black South African men as soldiers.

== History ==
=== Origin ===
In 1973 the apartheid government decided to train black soldiers.

On 21 January 1974, the Army Bantu Training Centre was established at Baviaanspoort, north of Pretoria. Sixteen recruits began basic training in March 1974 with another 38 men joining in August, now trained by the sixteen initial recruits.

In April 1975, authority was given for blacks to attest in the then-Permanent Force. On 1 December 1975, the Army Bantu Training Centre became a self-accounting unit and moved to Lenz, south of Johannesburg. The centre was then renamed 21 Battalion on the 21st birthday of the South African Infantry Corps in 1975.

Press releases during 1977 emphasised that these black soldiers would not be trained for South African combat roles. By 1978, the Chief of the South African Army begun to implement plans to establish 21 Battalion as the training school for black soldiers of different ethnic groups.

=== Homeland Units ===
The plan was for these recruits to serve in ethnic units in the current regional commands with their eventual adoption into the black homeland armies. The Lenz unit would train over eight years, up to eighteen black battalions, distributing them into these regional battalions.

Initial units were the Zulu 121 Battalion at Jozini, Natal Command, the Swazi 111 Battalion at Amsterdam, Northern Transvaal Command, the Venda 112 Battalion at Madimbo and the Shangaan 113 Battalion at Impala near Phalaborwa. The size of the battalion ranged from 35 men in 1975, reaching over 400 to 515 men in 1979.

=== Training ===
Training started with a 10-week orientation course that was used to weed out those not suited for military service and would eventually cull at least half of the recruits.

The Second Phase of Basic training took 17 weeks as opposed to 12 weeks for white recruits and was conducted by black trainers in the form of COIN training.

Phase Three resulted in specialised training and was conducted by white trainers with the men being trained to be clerks, storemen, tradesmen, mechanics, chefs and drivers.

Training time for ranks of corporals and sergeants was identical to white recruits and was conducted by white trainers and resulted in the first corporals in 1977 and 21 sergeants in 1979.

The January 1977 intake figures were 82 men, 260 men in 1979 and 350 by 1978. The unit expanded training to black recruits that formed units from the black homelands of the Transkei, 1 Transkei Battalion, Venda (later 15 SAI) and KwaNdebele(later 115 Battalion) as well as 48 men from Ovamboland, 1 Ovambo Battalion and 100 men of 121 Battalion.

=== Later years ===
During March 1978, 140 men in three platoons, were deployed to the Eastern Caprivi for three months with the objective of liaising with the local population and to gather intelligence from any friendships cultivated. This was followed up with a second unit in 1979.

By 1986 the unit had four companies of its own troops. In July 1987 it became a fully operational battalion, and was used as a reaction force in South Africa before being posted to South-West Africa/Namibia in 1988 during the Border War.

=== Redesignated as a SAI ===
21 SAI was established on 1 January 1991 at Doornkop, Johannesburg.

=== SANDF era ===
In 1997 the unit was commanded by a colonel and consisted of two operational battalions. By 1999, it had reverted to four infantry companies and a reconnaissance platoon.

== Freedom of Entry ==
The unit exercised its freedom of entry into Johannesburg on 9 November 2013 as part of the centenary celebrations of the City of Johannesburg with fixed bayonets, colours flying and drums beating.

== Leadership ==
Leadership
| From | Honorary Colonel | To | Ribbon |
|---|---|---|---|
| | No known incumbents | | |
| From | Officer Commanding | To | Ribbon |
| | Lt Col S. Coghill | | |
| From | Regimental Sergeants Major | To | Ribbon |
| | WO1 T.E. Carelse | | |

== Insignia ==
=== Previous Dress Insignia ===
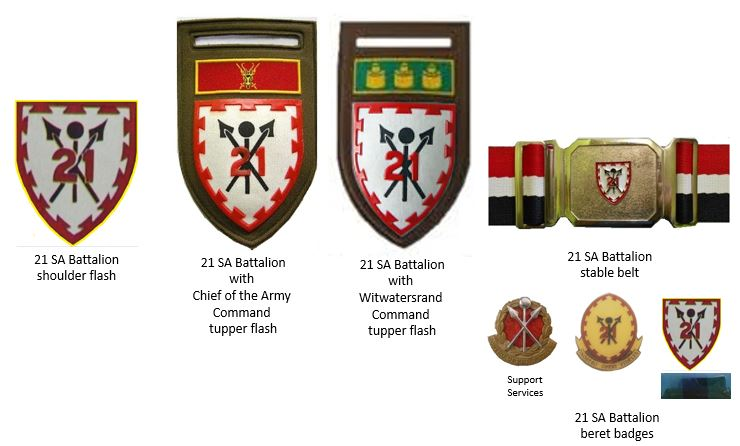
SADF era 21 SA Battalion insignia

=== Current Dress Insignia ===
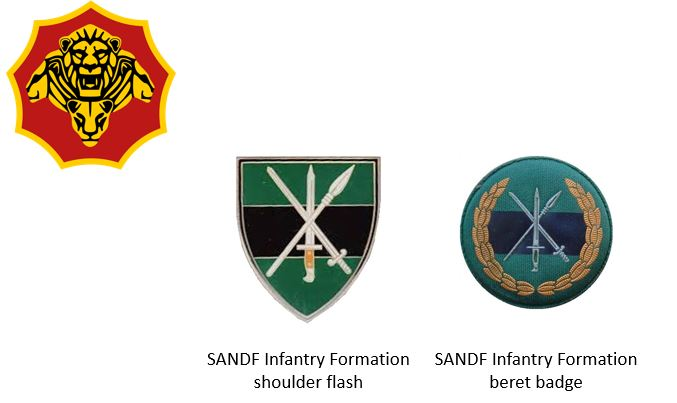
SANDF era Infantry Formation insignia
