= ATE Vulture =

South African UAV

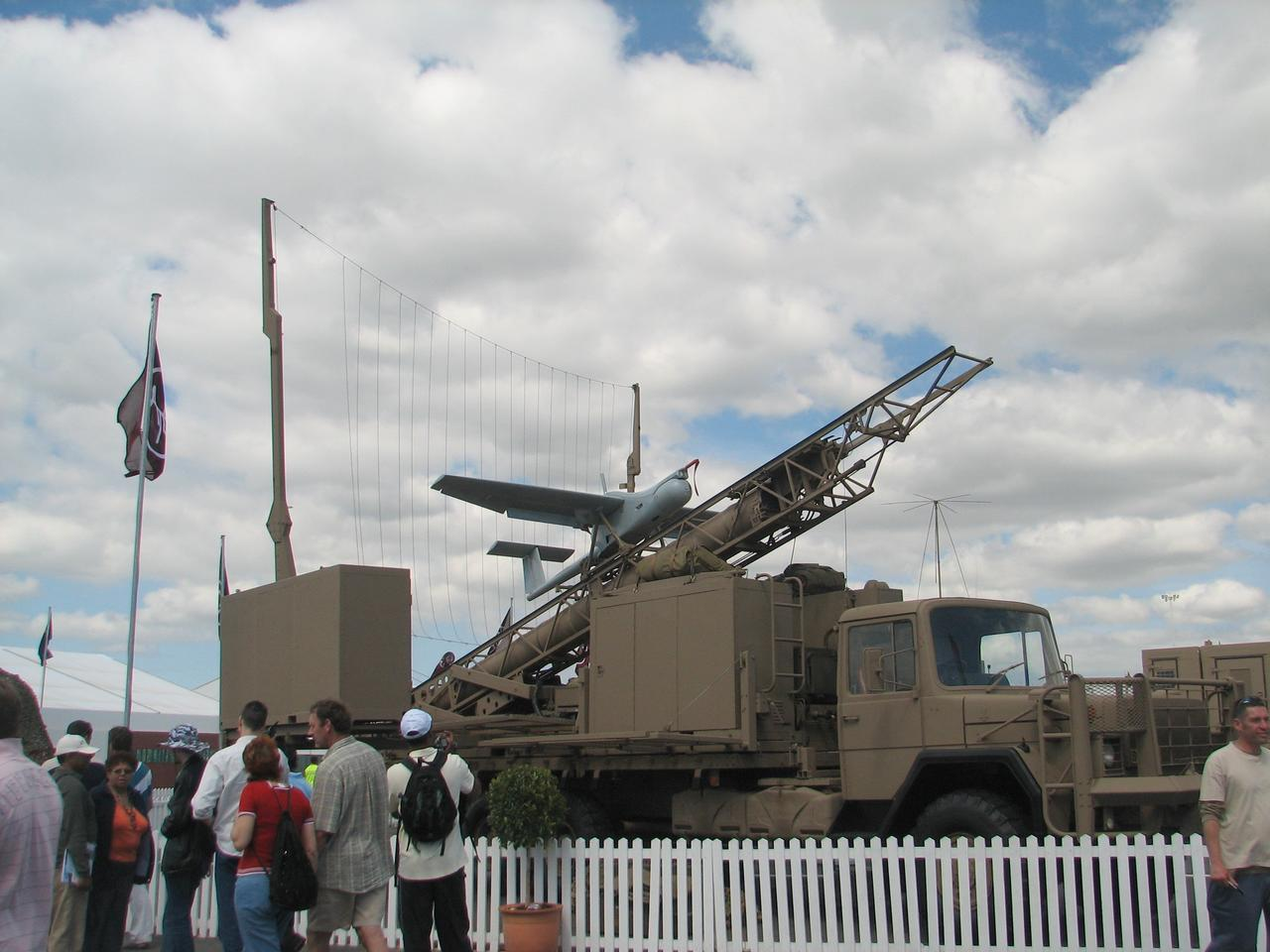
Samil 100 Vulture Launcher System at Ysterplaat Airshow, Cape Town.

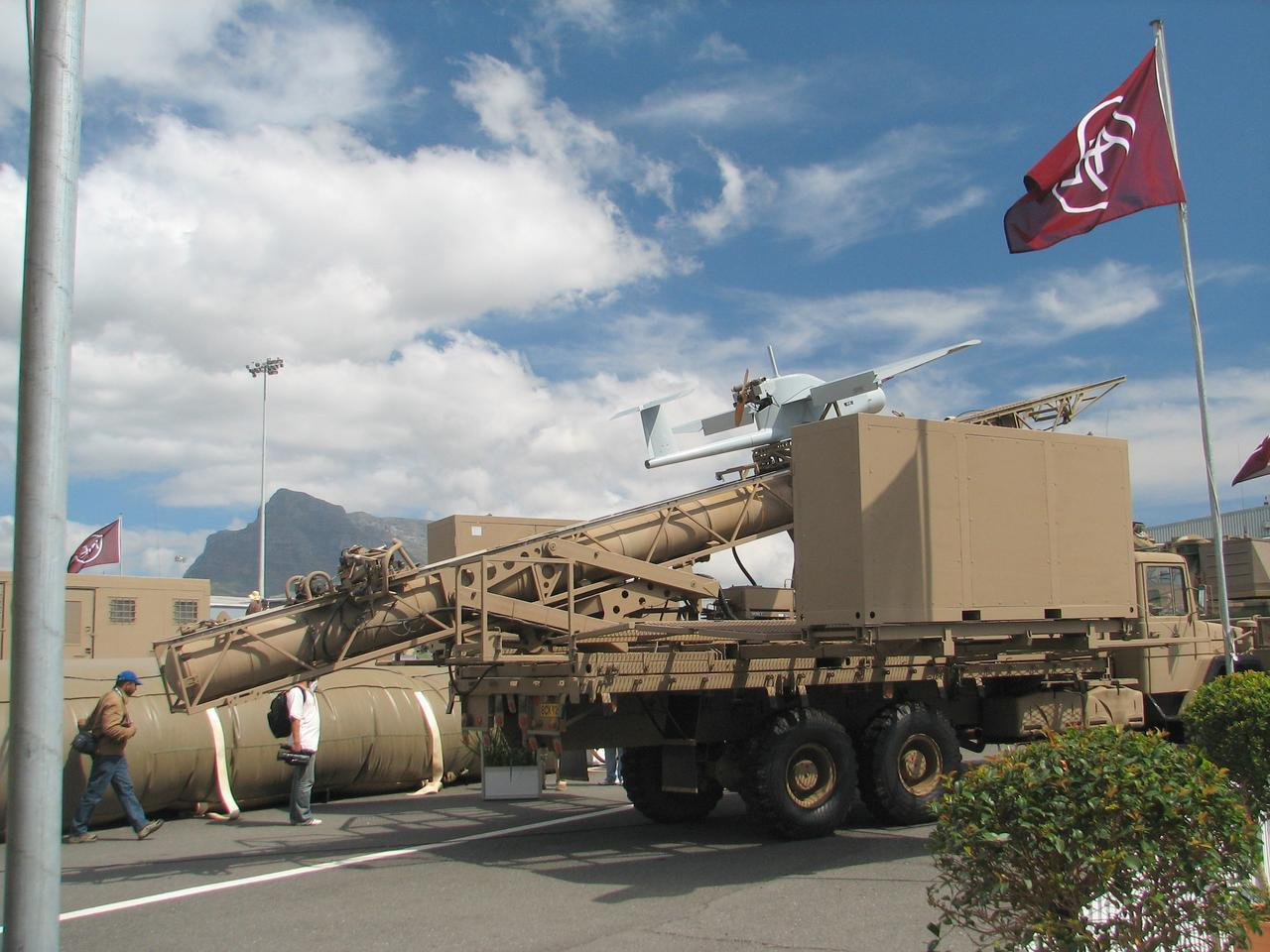
Samil 100 Vulture Launcher System at Ysterplaat Airshow, Cape Town.

The ATE Vulture is a South African unmanned aerial vehicle (UAV) designed and built by Advanced Technologies and Engineering (now Paramount Advanced Technologies, a division of the Paramount Group). It is powered by a 500 cc 2-stroke fuel injected engine. Its payload is a gyro stabilised optronic sight communicating on a secure C-Band data/video link. Its cruise speed is 120 km/h and its flight duration allows a loiter time of about 4 hours at 60 km from the launch site with a maximum ceiling of 5,000 m. It is fully automated in launch, flight and recovery, with an automatic return-to-base in case of mission critical failures. An automated vacuum type catapult launcher is mounted on a Samil 100 truck. No external pilot is required, and the transition from launch mode into pre-programmed flight mode is automatic. It is used by the South African Army artillery for target acquisition and fire control.
