= SAMIL Trucks =

South African military truck family

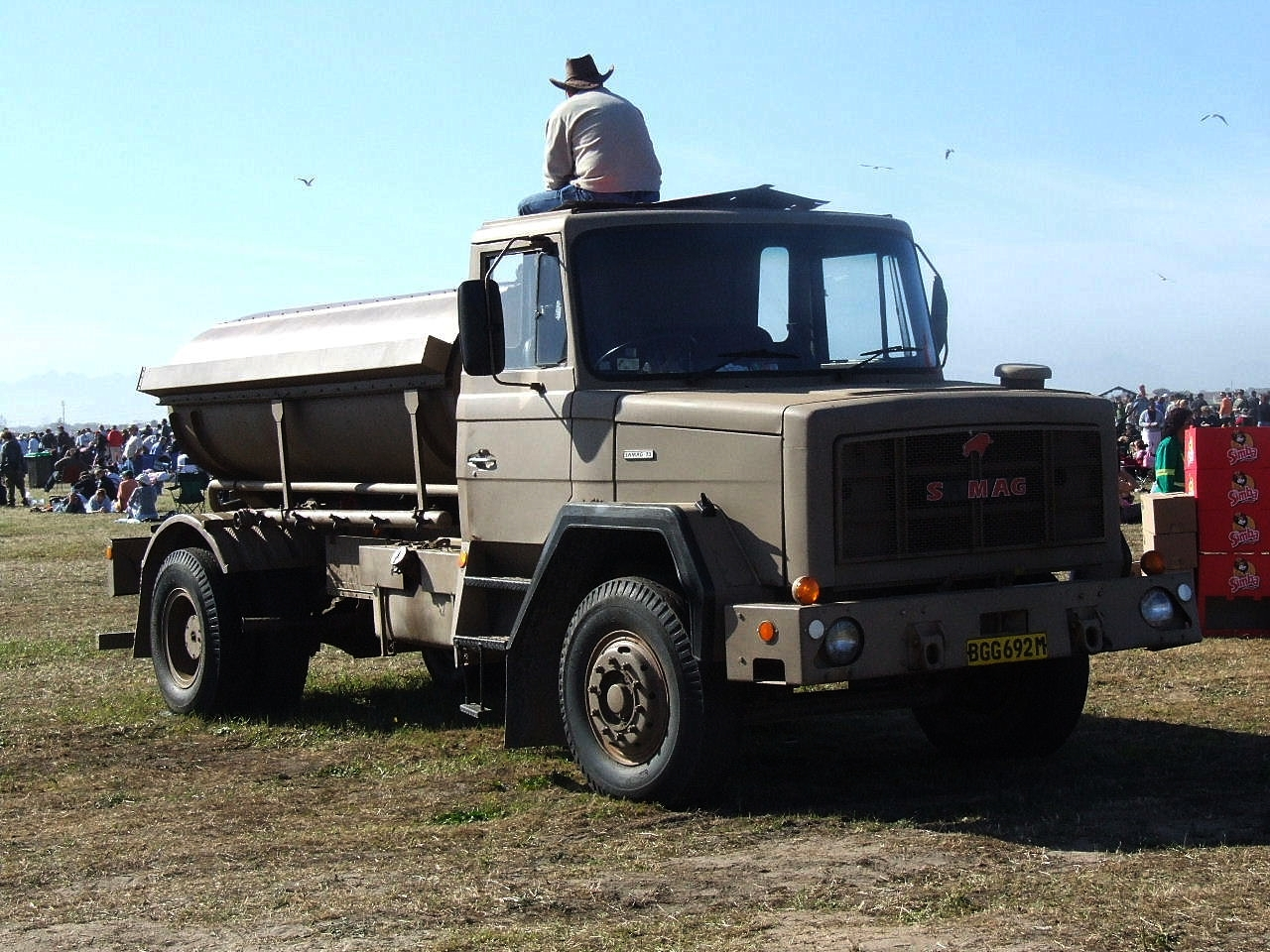
SAMAG 70 water tanker

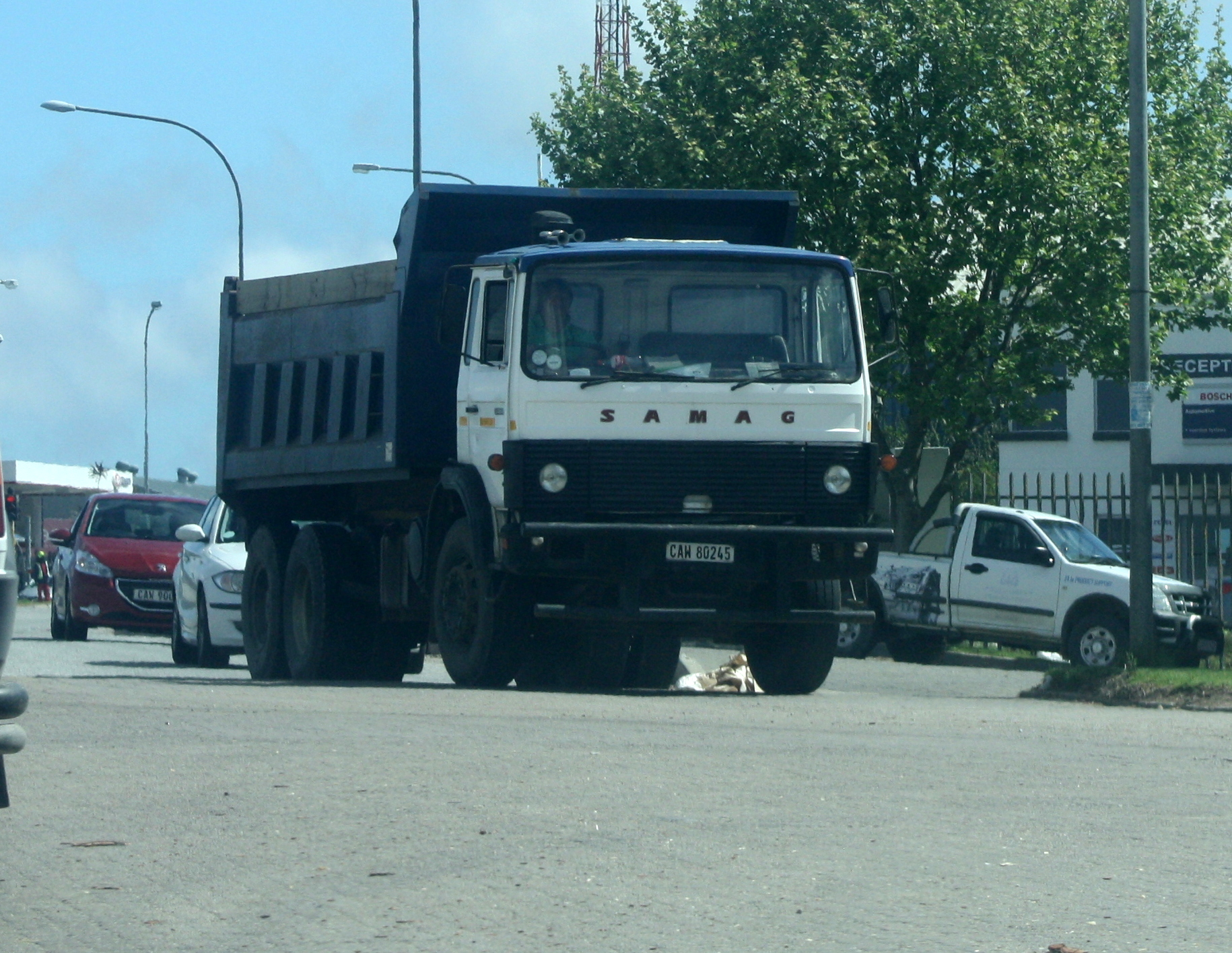
SAMAG tipper truck

SAMIL Trucks (South African MILitary) are the standard logistical transport vehicles of the South African National Defence Force (and its predecessor the South African Defence Force). SAMILs are currently re-manufactured by Truck-Makers in Rosslyn, Pretoria, Drakensberg Truck Manufacturers in Wallmansthal, N1 Trucks in Wallmansthal and Transvaal Motors in Boksburg. The civilian versions of these trucks are called SAMAG (South African MAGirus). Original production of these vehicles ended in 1998.

These trucks all have a high-strength chassis, making them capable of handling severe off-road conditions, and are thus an ideal vehicle for the South African Army.

In recent years, reconditioned and remanufactured military surplus SAMIL trucks have also been made available to the private sector and vehicles have been sold to mining groups, exploration companies, contractors, farmers and many other organisations in fields such as tourism and forestry.

== Types ==
Essentially upgraded versions of Magirus Deutz diesel-engined trucks, the range includes the following vehicles:

1. SAMIL 20
2. SAMIL 50
3. SAKOM 50: The SAKOM 50A is a 7-tonne 4x2 version of the SAMIL 50. The SAKOM 50 uses a SAMIL 20 cab and is employed on second-line duties.
4. SAMIL 100

== Citations and references ==
=== Bibliography ===
Jane's (1985). Jane's Military Vehicles and Ground Support Equipment. London: Jane's Publishing Company Ltd. ISBN 0-7106-0811-X.
