= SAMIL 100 =

SAMIL 100 10-ton 6x6 Truck
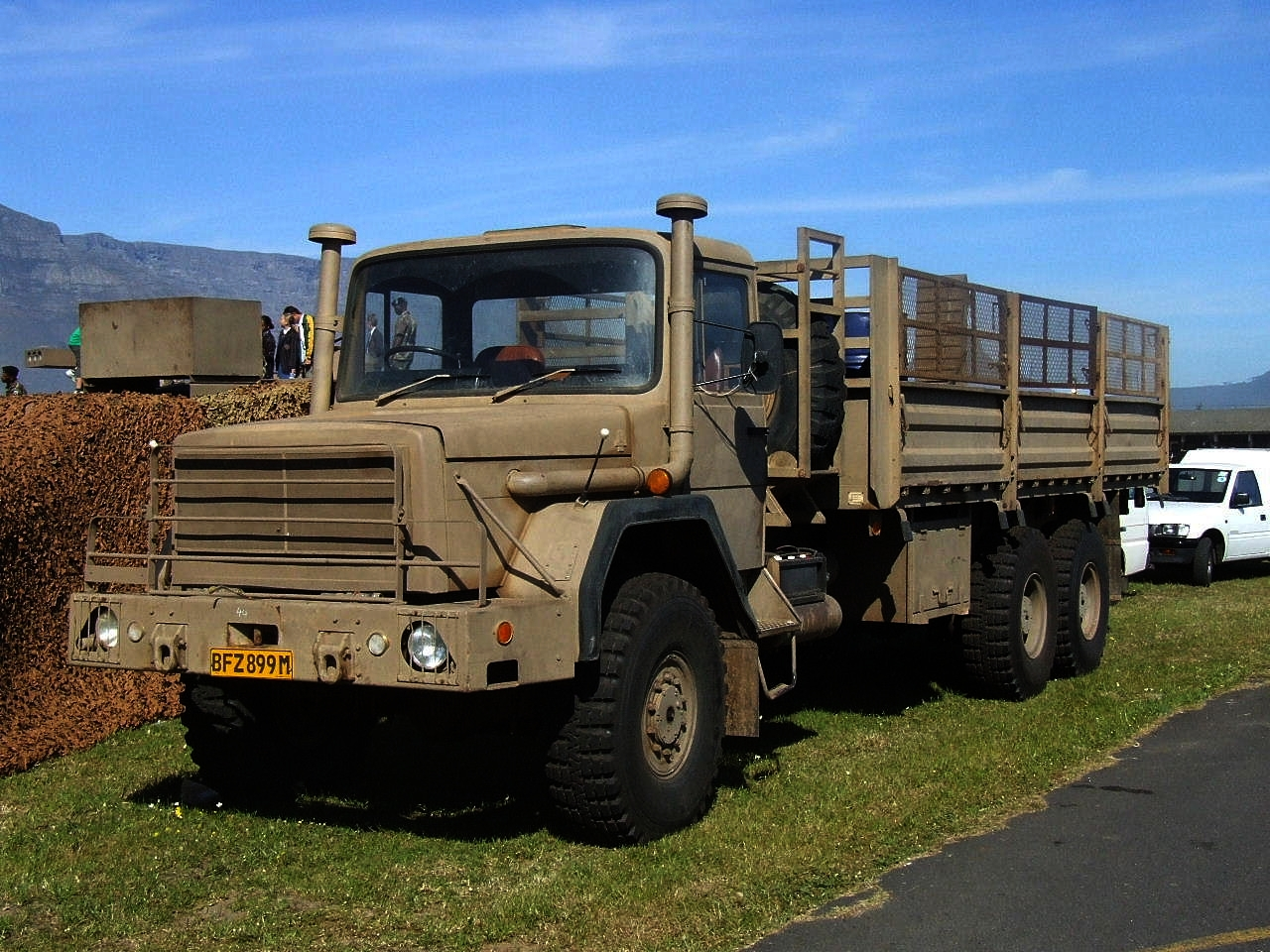
- SAMIL 100 cargo
- Type: 10-ton 6x6 truck
- Place of origin: South Africa

Production history
- Designer: Armscor
- Manufacturer: Truckmakers
- Produced: In production up to 1998
- Variants: Cargo; Cargo with mine protected cab Tipper; Water Tanker; Fuel tanker Recovery vehicle Artillery tractor 127mm Valkiri (Mk II) MultipleRocket Launcher

Specifications (SAMIL 100 Cargo)
- Mass: 9,135 kg (20,139 lb) (empty)
- Length: 10.27 m (33.7 ft)
- Width: 2.5 m (8 ft 2 in)
- Height: 3.35 m (11.0 ft)
- Crew: 2
- Passengers: 50
- Engine: Deutz Diesel Engines V10 cylinder air cooled diesel or ADE 352 T 268 hp (200 kW)
- Transmission: 6 speed x 2 range
- Suspension: Telescopic hydraulic shock absorbers on leaf springs
- Operational range: 800 km (500 mi)

The SAMIL 100 is an upgraded Magirus Deutz 320D22AL 6x6 10-ton (load) truck. Classified as a heavy truck, it is made of pressed steel with the cargo area (capable of carrying up to 50 passengers) having drop sides and a tailgate.

== Variants ==
- 10-ton cargo vehicle with 1.2-ton capacity crane mounted behind cab.
- Mine resistant cab based cargo vehicle
- Dump truck
- Fuel tanker
- Gun tractor
- Field kitchen
- Refrigerator truck
- Ambulance
- Recovery vehicle
- Carrier for 127mm multiple rocket launcher
- Carrier for a twin 23 mm anti-aircraft cannon
Variants of the SAMIL 100 vehicle
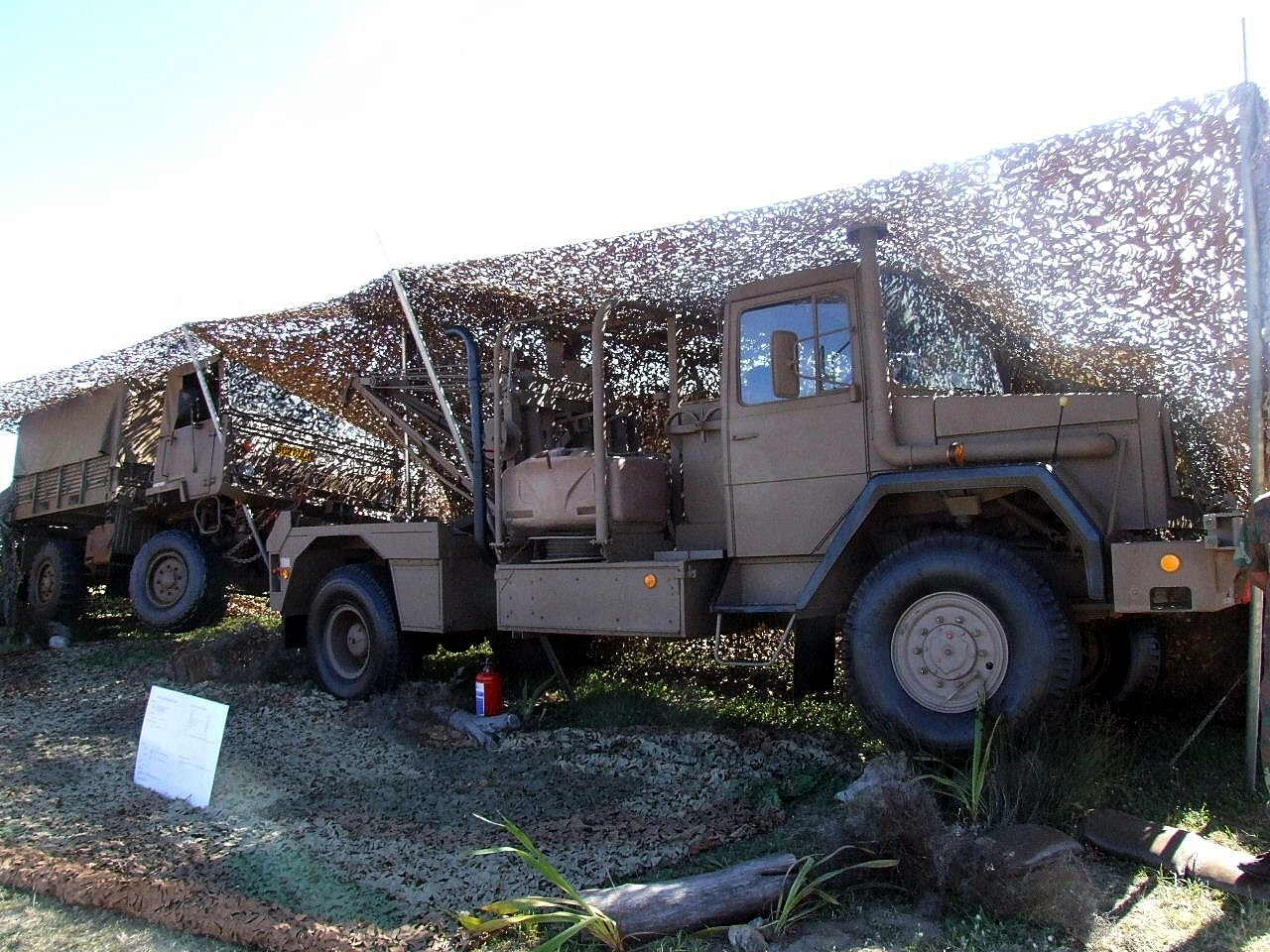
A display showing SAMIL 20 towed by SAMIL 50 recovery vehicle

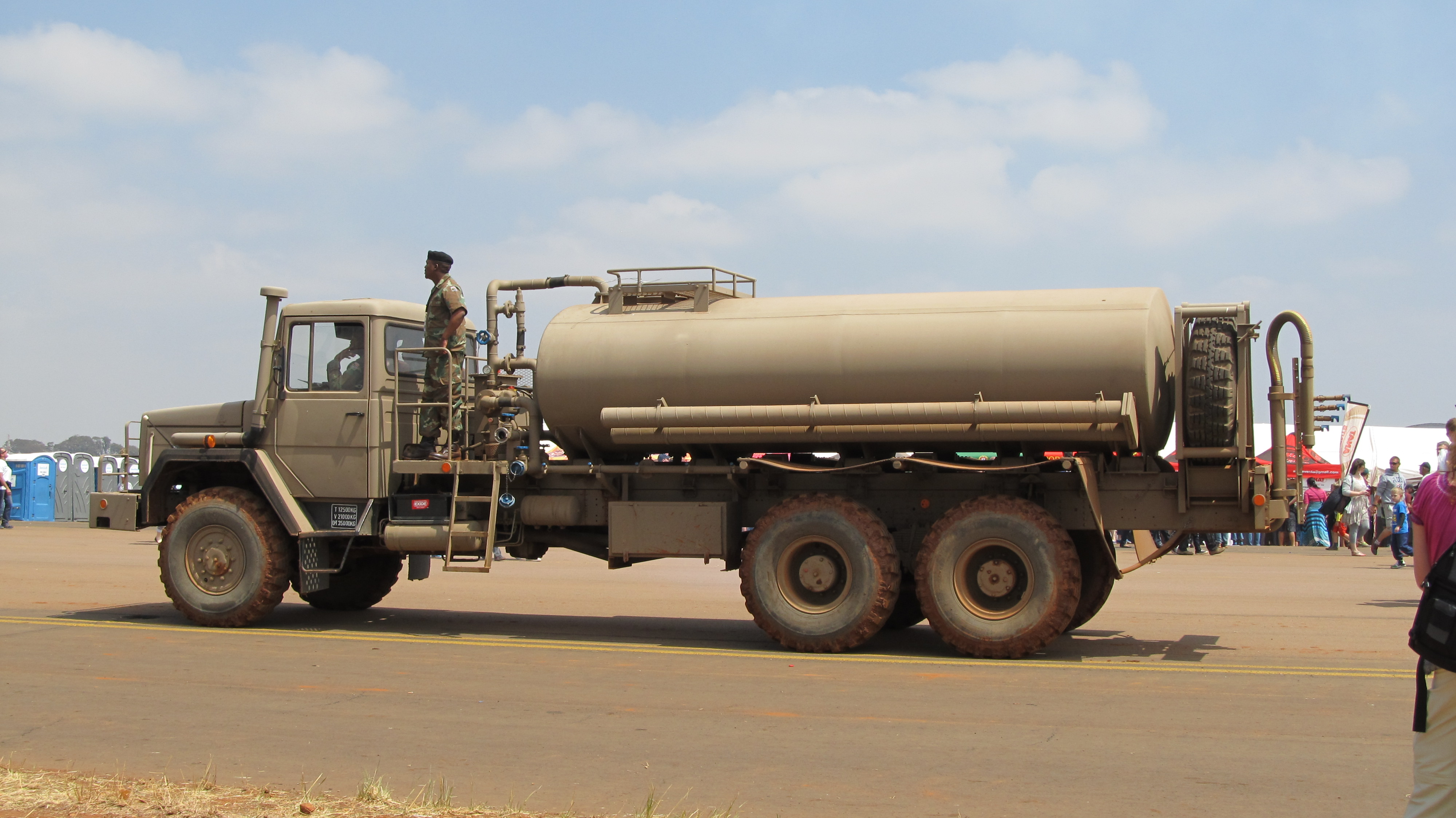
SAMIL 100 water tanker

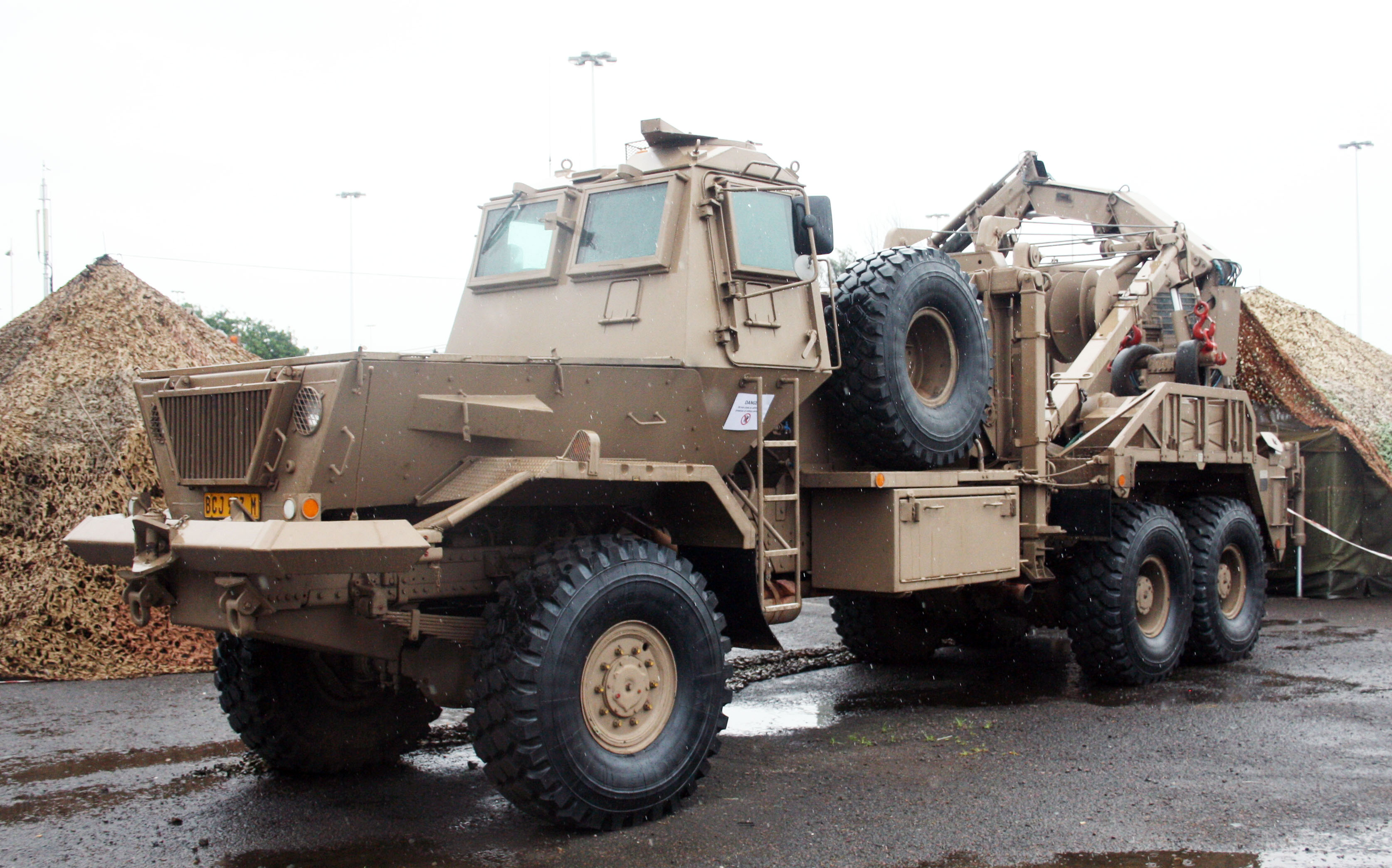
SAMIL 100 Kwevoel (mine protected cab) recovery vehicle

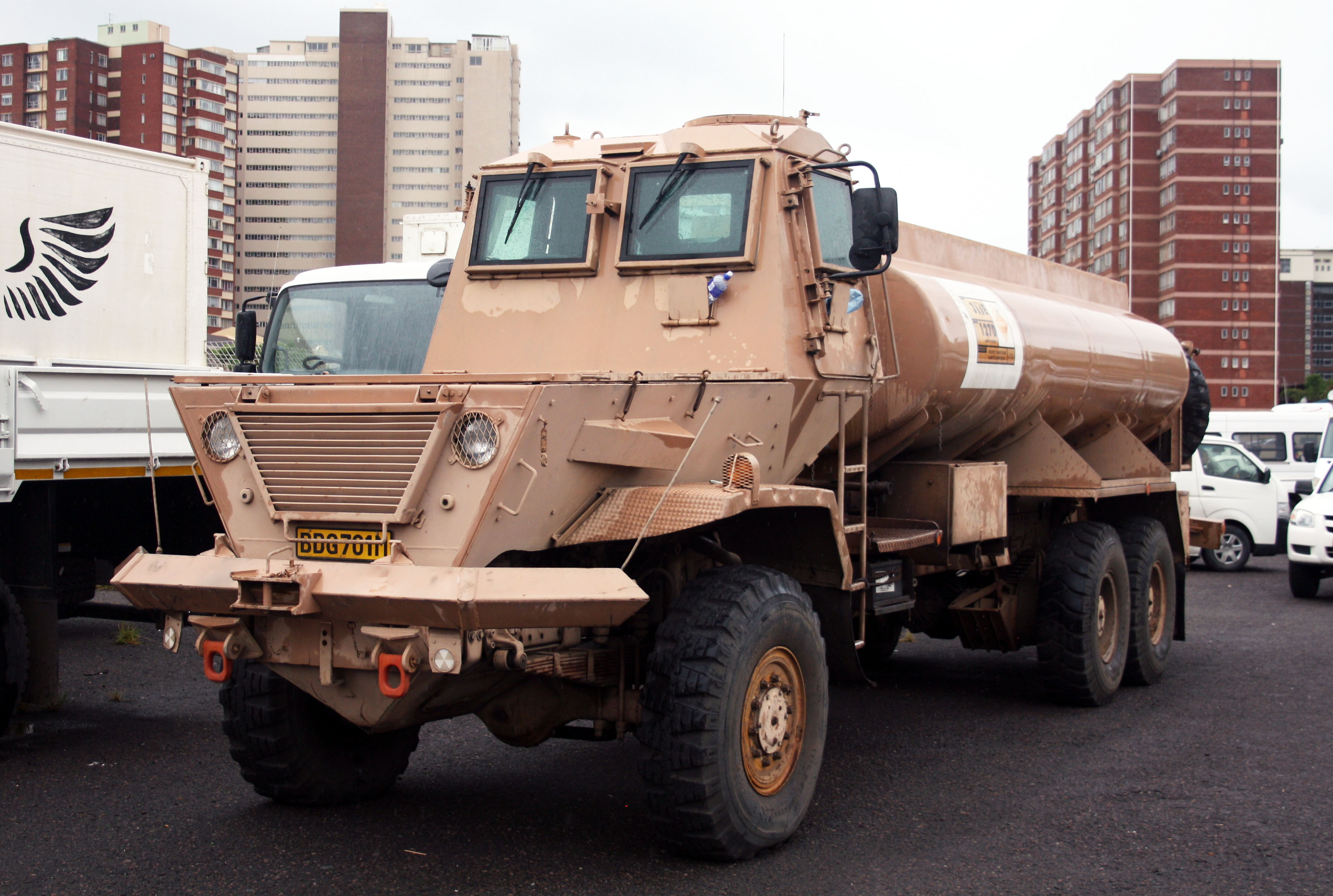
SAMIL 100 Kwevoel fuel tanker with mine resistant cab

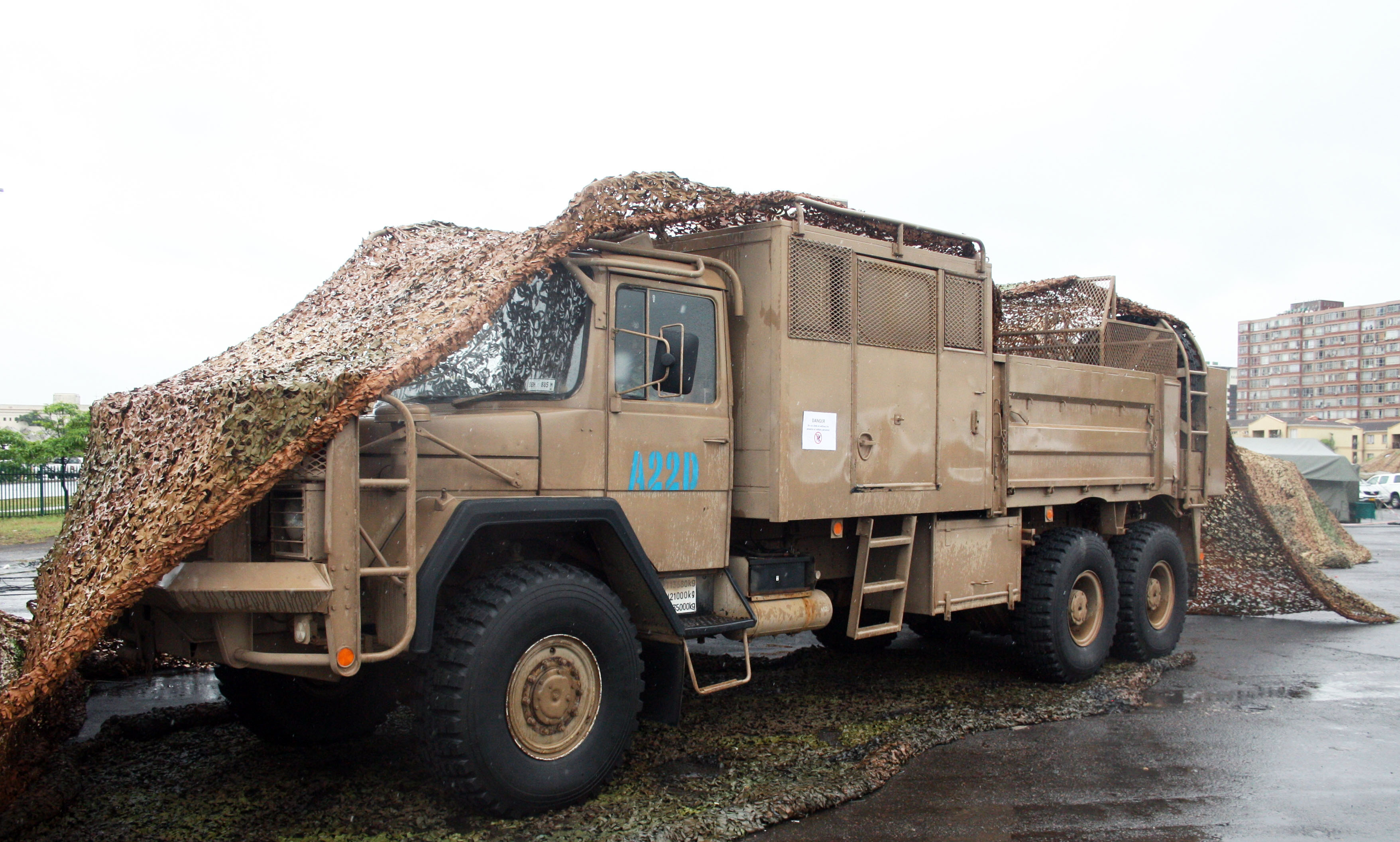
SAMIL 100 gun tractor

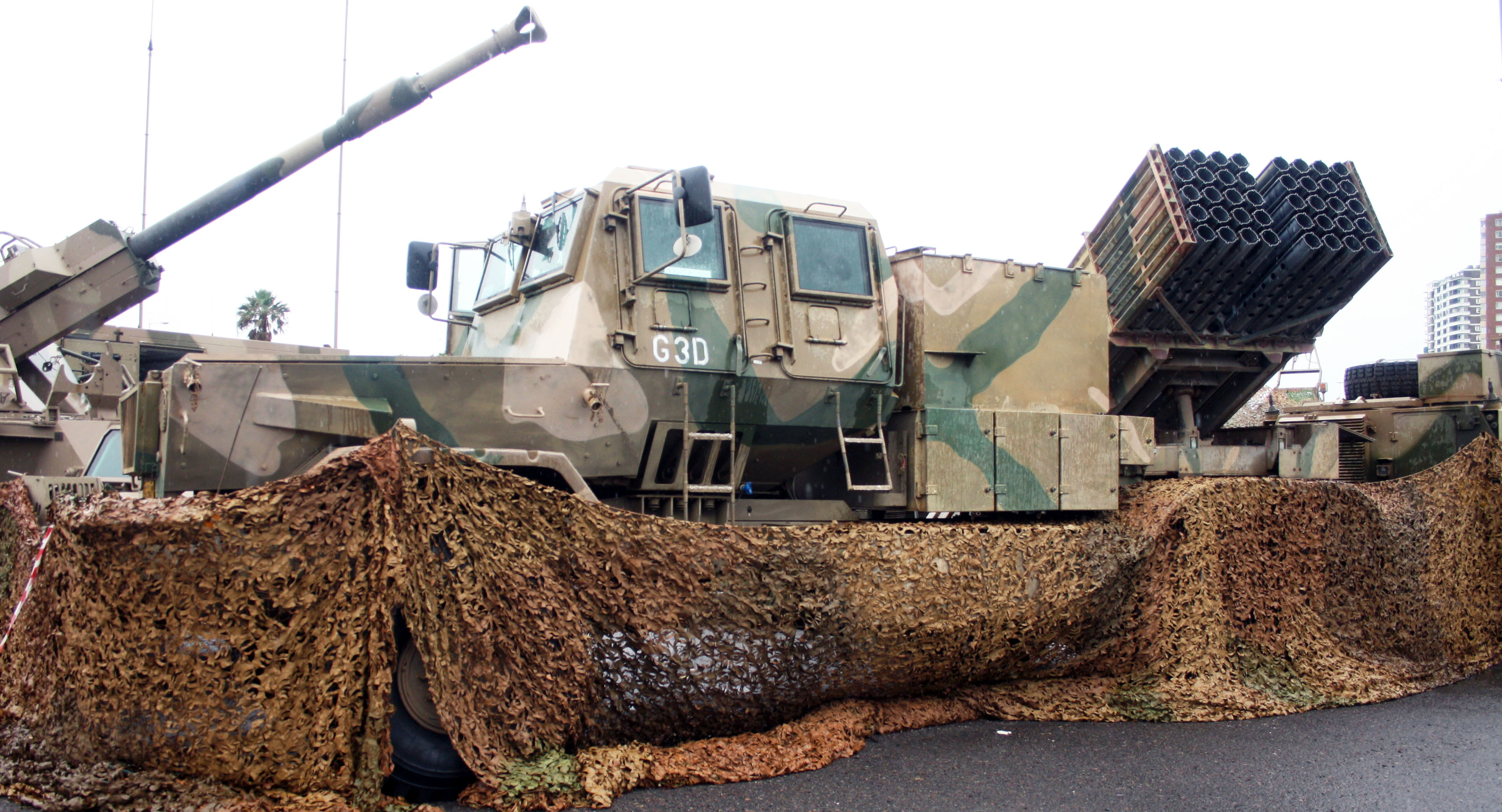
SAMIL 100 Kwevoel mine resistant vehicle carrying Valkiri 127mm MRL system

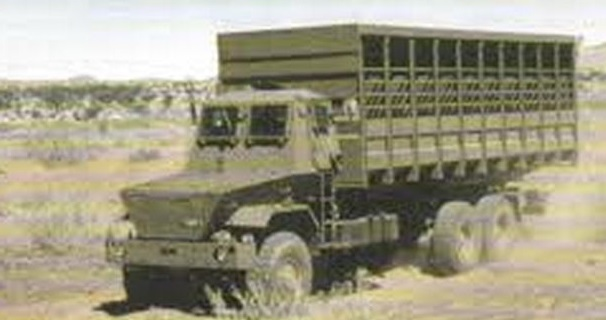
SAMIL 100 Kwevoel (armoured mine resistant cab) Horse carrier

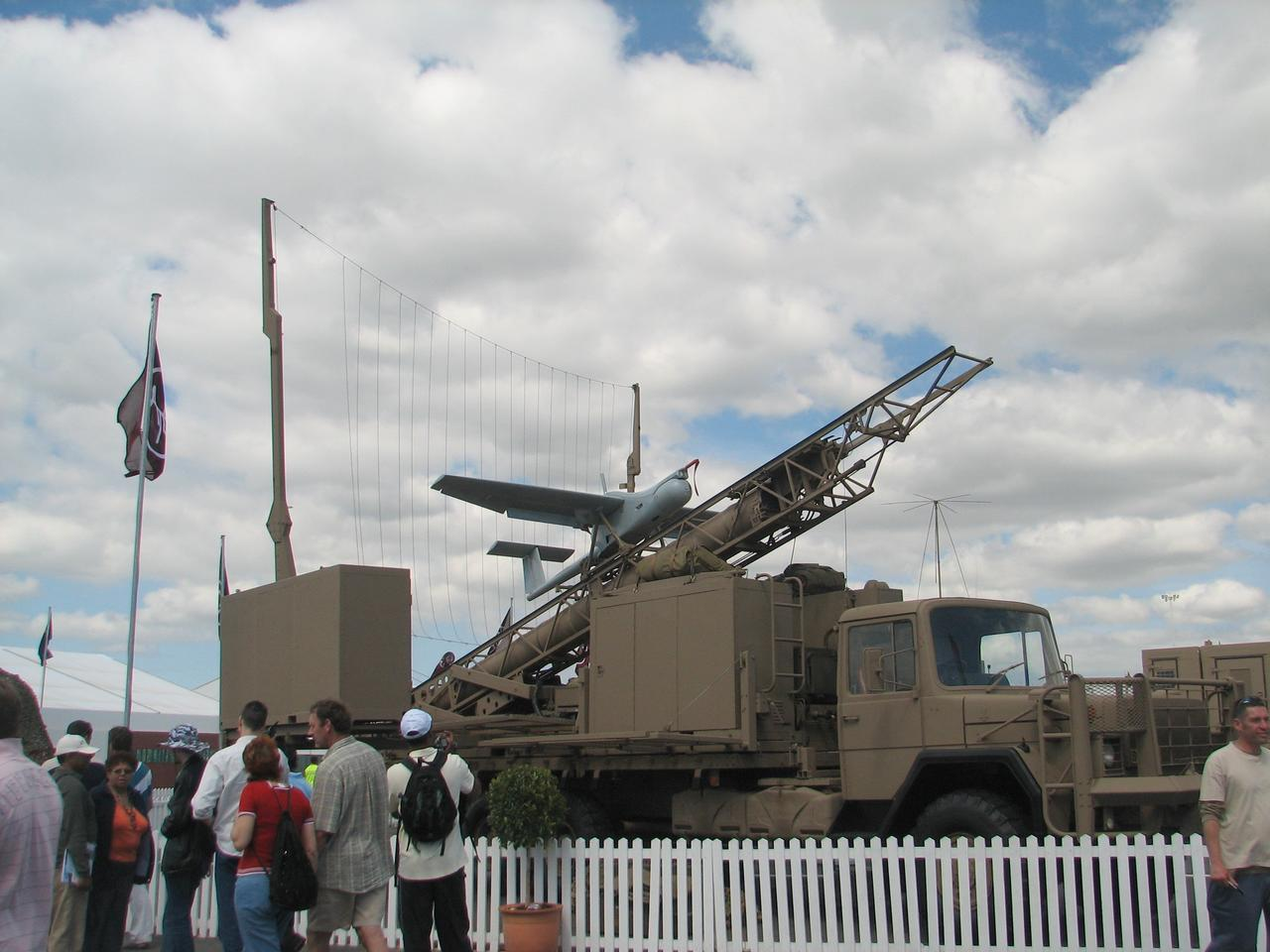
SAMIL 100 mounted with Vulture UAV launcher

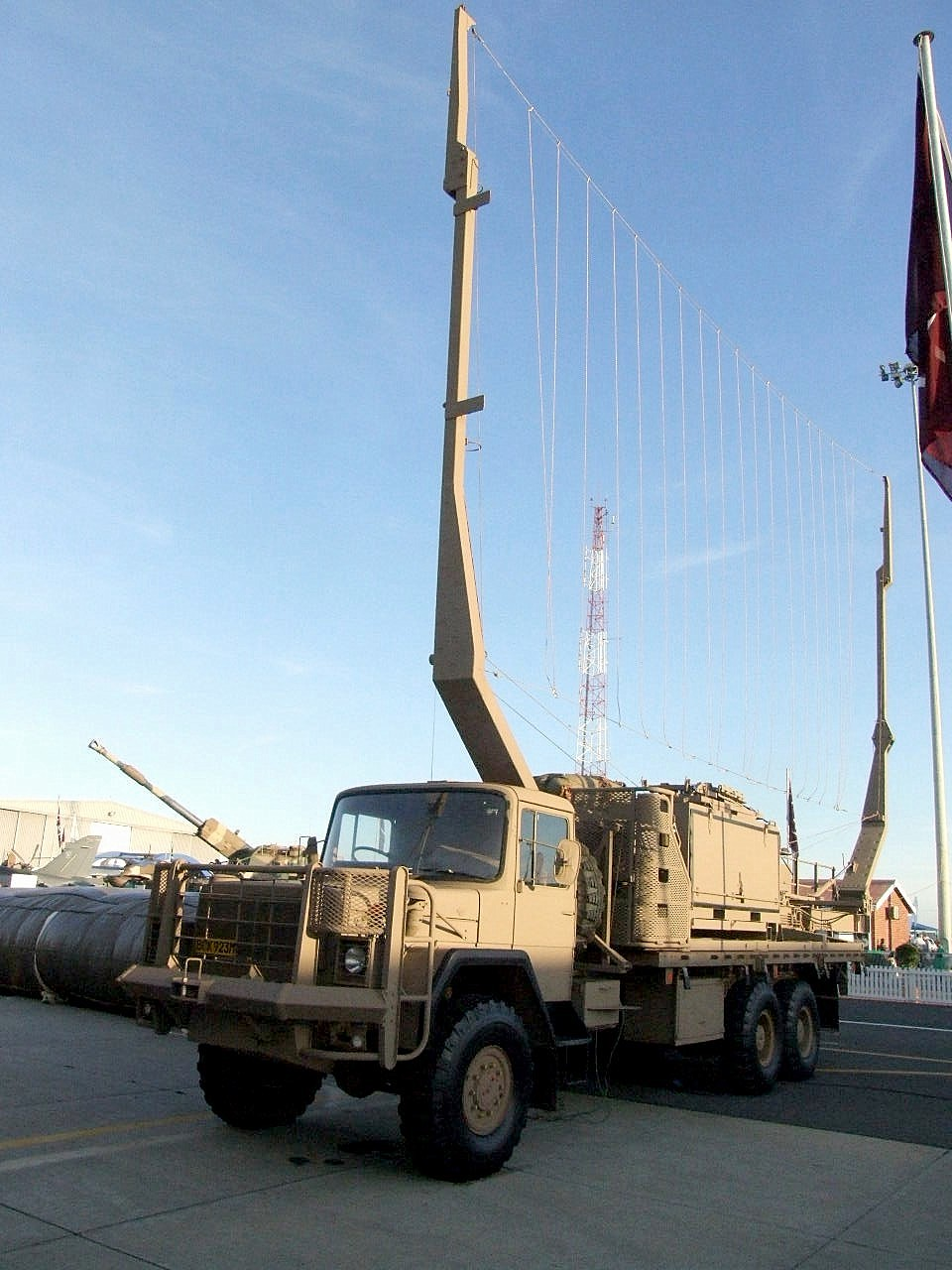
SAMIL 100 carrying UAV recovery net

== Citations and references ==
=== Bibliography ===
Jane's (1985). Jane's Military Vehicles and Ground Support Equipment. London: Jane's Publishing Company Ltd. ISBN 0-7106-0811-X.
