= SAMIL 50 =

SAMIL 50 6-ton 4x4 Truck
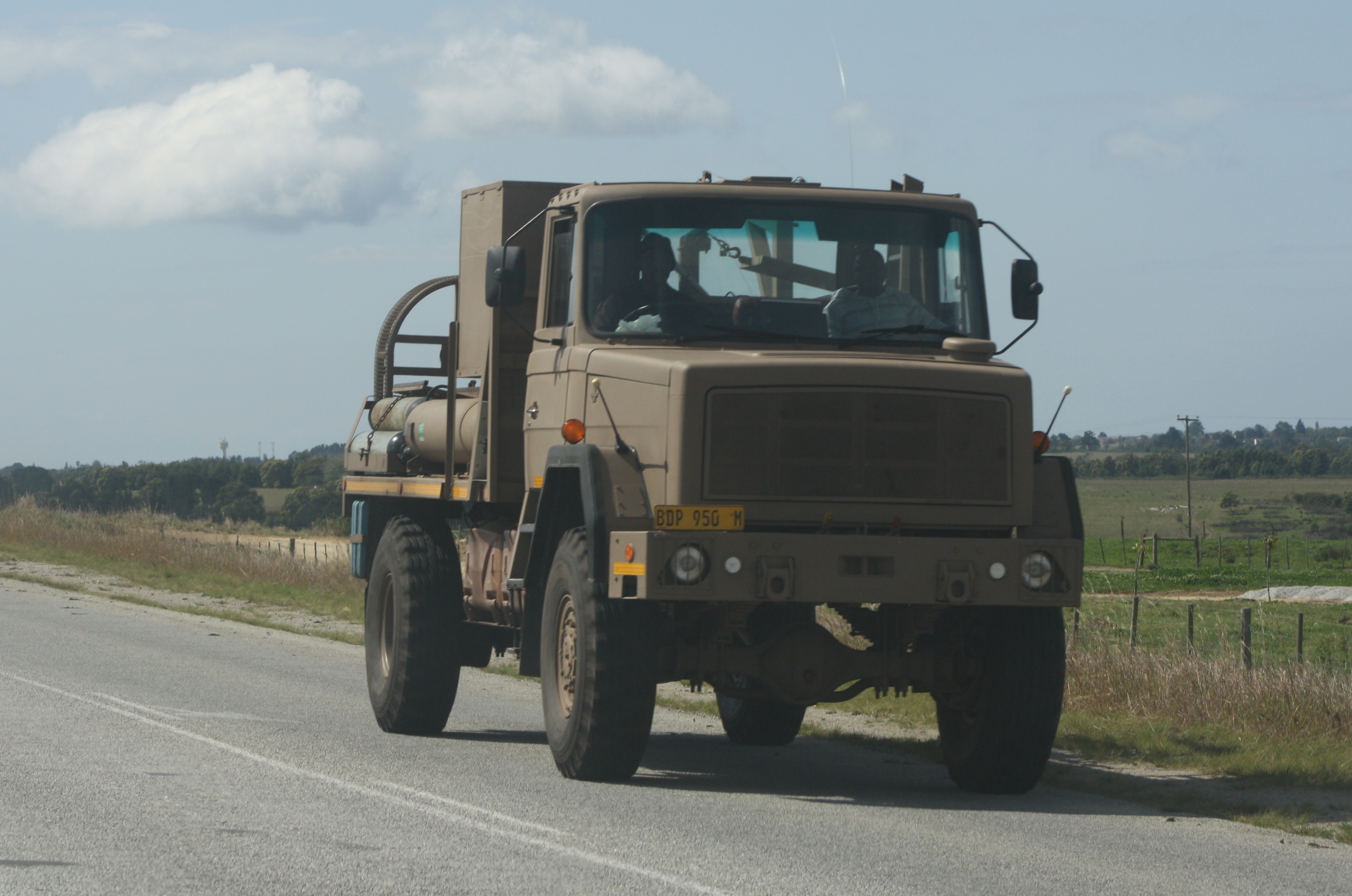
- SAMIL 50 truck
- Type: 6-ton 4x4 truck
- Place of origin: South Africa

Production history
- Designer: Armscor based on Magirus Deutz 192D12AL
- Produced: In production up to 1998
- Variants: Cargo (as in photo); Recovery; Telecommunications workshop Battery charging workshop Mobile welding workshop Water tanker Fuel tanker Pantry vehicle Armoured ambulance

Specifications (SAMIL 50 Cargo)
- Mass: 6,340 kg (13,980 lb) (empty)
- Length: 7.78 m (25.5 ft)
- Width: 2.5 m (8 ft 2 in)
- Height: 3.1 m (10 ft)
- Crew: 2
- Passengers: 40
- Engine: Atlantis Diesel Engines ADE 409N 9.5-litre V6 cylinder air cooled diesel 161 hp (120 kW)
- Transmission: 6 speed x 2 range
- Suspension: Telescopic hydraulic shock absorbers on leaf springs
- Operational range: 1,000 km (620 mi)
- Maximum speed: 88 km/h (55 mph)

The SAMIL 50 is a 4x4 6-ton (load) truck.

== Description ==
=== Dimensions ===
Data is based on SAMIL 50 cargo version:

- Length: 7,820 mm (308 in)
- Width: 2,450 mm (96 in)
- Height: 3,020 mm (119 in)
- Wheelbase: 4,900 mm (190 in)
- Ground Clearance: 355 mm (14.0 in)
- Track (Front): 1,985 mm (78.1 in)
- Track (Rear): 2,030 mm (80 in)
- Angle of approach: 36°
- Angle of departure: 33°
- Fuel tank capacity: 2x 200 L (44 imp gal; 53 US gal)

=== Weights ===
- Gross vehicle mass: 12,400 kg (27,300 lb)
- Front axle rating: 5,500 kg (12,100 lb)
- Rear axle rating: 9,500 kg (20,900 lb)
- Payload: 6,000 kg (13,000 lb)

=== Specifications ===
- Drive: 4×4
- Engine: Mk I: Deutz F6L 413F
  - Configuration: 6 Cylinders V6
  - Engine capacity: 9572 cc
  - Cooling: Air-cooled
  - Power: 141 kW (188 hp) @ 2500 rpm
  - Torque: 632 Nm @ 1600 rpm
- Engine: Mk II: ADE409
  - Configuration: 6 Cylinders V6
  - Engine capacity:
  - Cooling: Water-cooled
  - Power:
  - Torque:
- Clutch
  - Type: Single dry plate
  - Size: 350 mm (14 in)
- Gearbox
  - Make/Model: ZF S6-65
  - Forward gears: 6 Speed Synchromesh
- Transfer case
  - Make/Model: ZF Z65
  - Type: 2 Speed, Permanent 4×4
  - Differential Lock: Pneumatically operated
- Axles
  - Front: Banjo housing
  - Differential Lock: Pneumatically operated
  - Rear: Banjo housing
  - Differential Lock: Pneumatically operated
- Wheels:
  - Single wheel all-round
  - Tyre size: 14.0 x 20” – 12 Ply
- Steering type: Rhd – Power Assisted
- Brakes
  - Service Brakes: Dual Circuit – Full air
  - Park Brake: Pneumatically operated spring
- Suspension
  - Springs: Semi elliptical leaf springs
  - Shock absorbers: Double acting telescopic hydraulic (Ft & Rr)
  - Torsion Bar: Fitted to rear axle
- Electrical
  - Voltage: 24V
  - Batteries: 2 x 12V 120 A/h
- Cab
  - Type: Forward Control with Canvas Roof
  - Seating: Driver + 1 Assistant
  - Access to Engine: Cab tilts forward
  - Steering: Left-hand Drive
  - Standard hard cab

== Variants ==
- Cargo/Personnel Carrier – it has a canvas cover over a steel framework around the cargo area; seats for up to 40 passengers may be installed along the sides or down the center, back to back.
- Communications vehicle
- Battery-charging vehicle
- Bridge transporter
- Field kitchen vehicle
- Field office
- Flatbed container transporter with ISO locks
- Fuel tanker
- Mobile shower unit vehicle
- Mobile welding shop vehicle
- Radio bin
- Refrigerator pantry Unit
- Refuse collection vehicle
- Technical bin
- Water tanker
- Recovery vehicle
- Kwevoel – Armoured Mine Resistant cargo vehicle
Variants of the SAMIL 50 vehicle
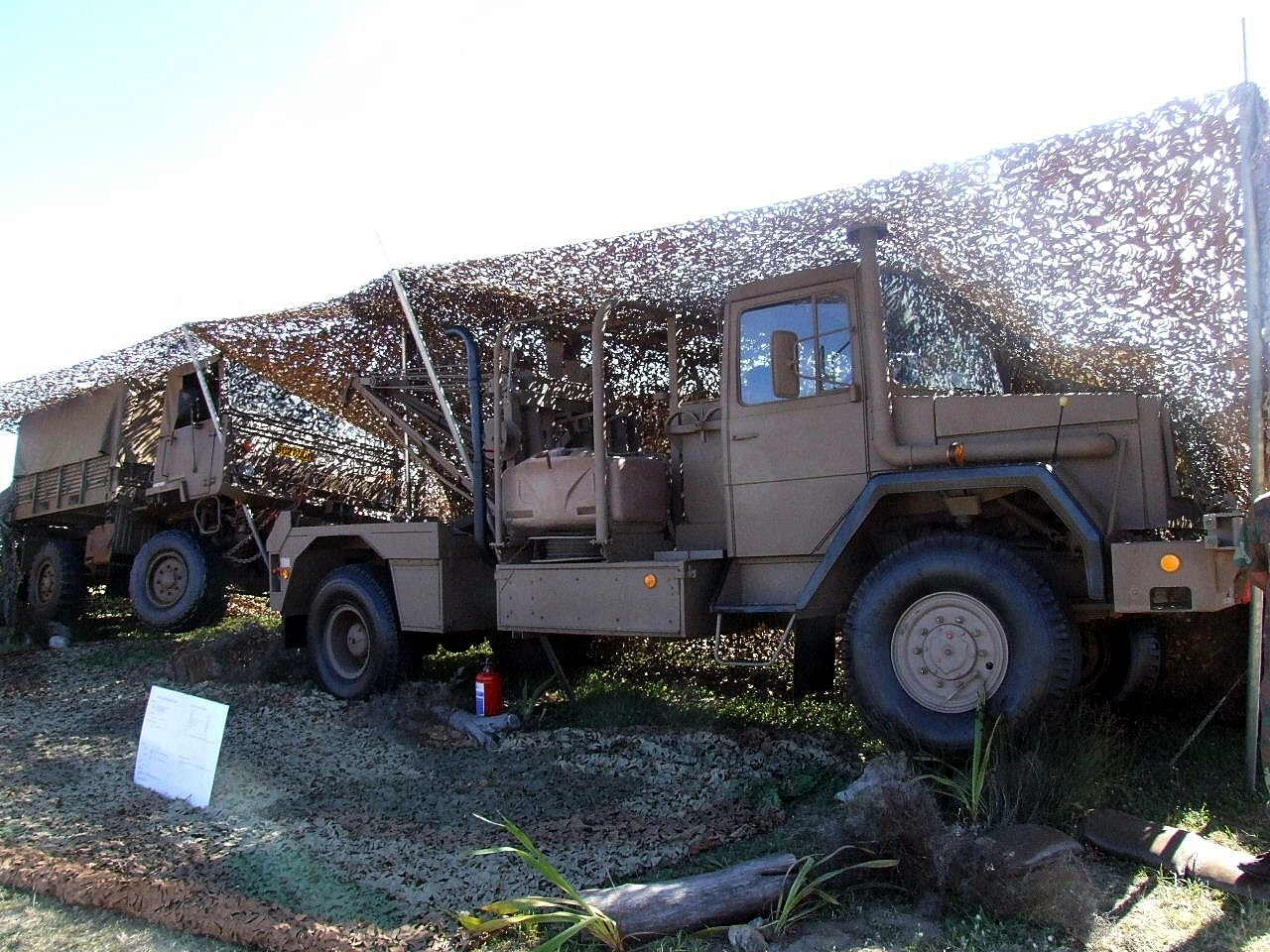
A display showing SAMIL 20 towed by SAMIL 50 recovery vehicle

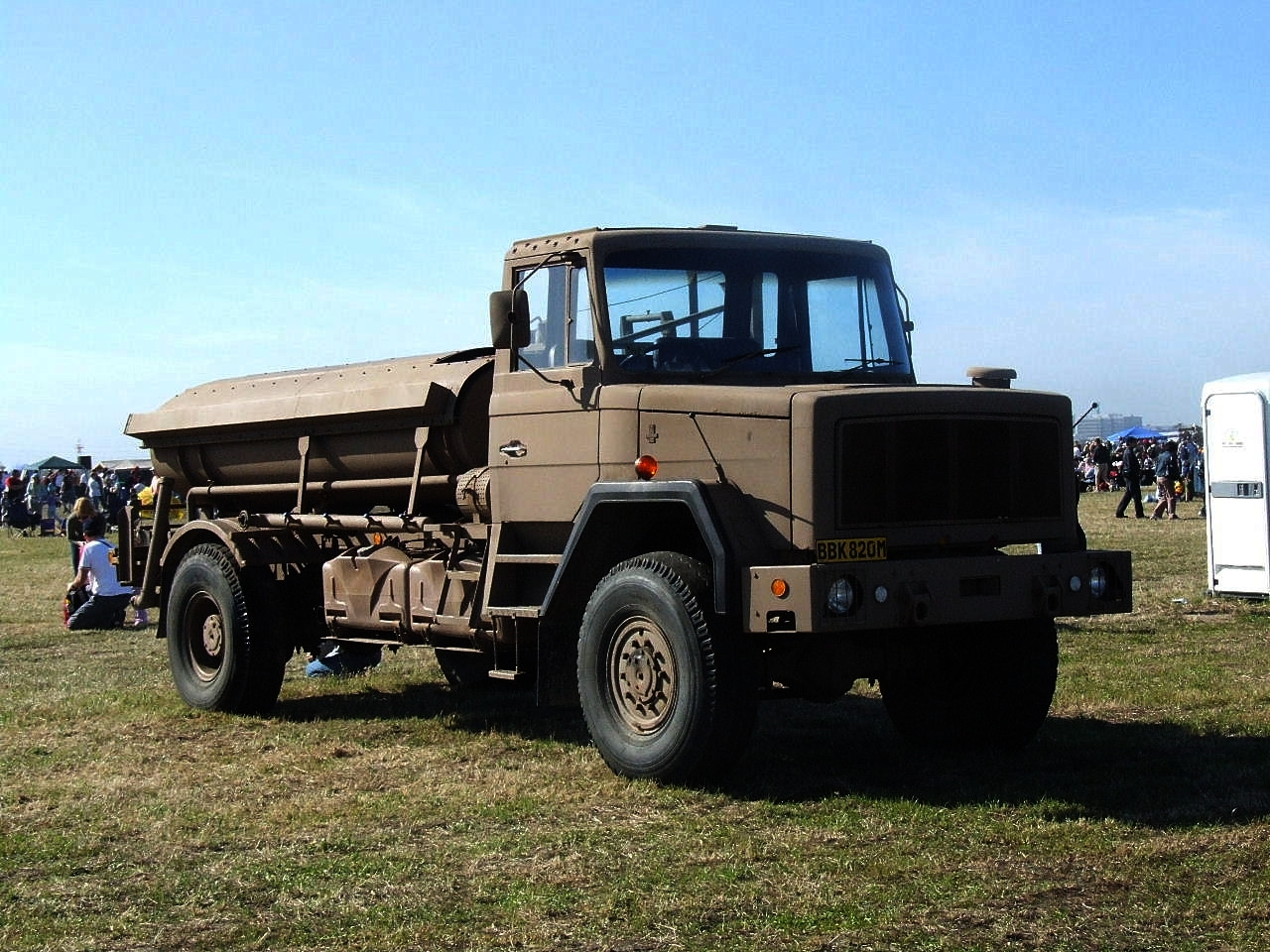
SAMIL 50 water tanker

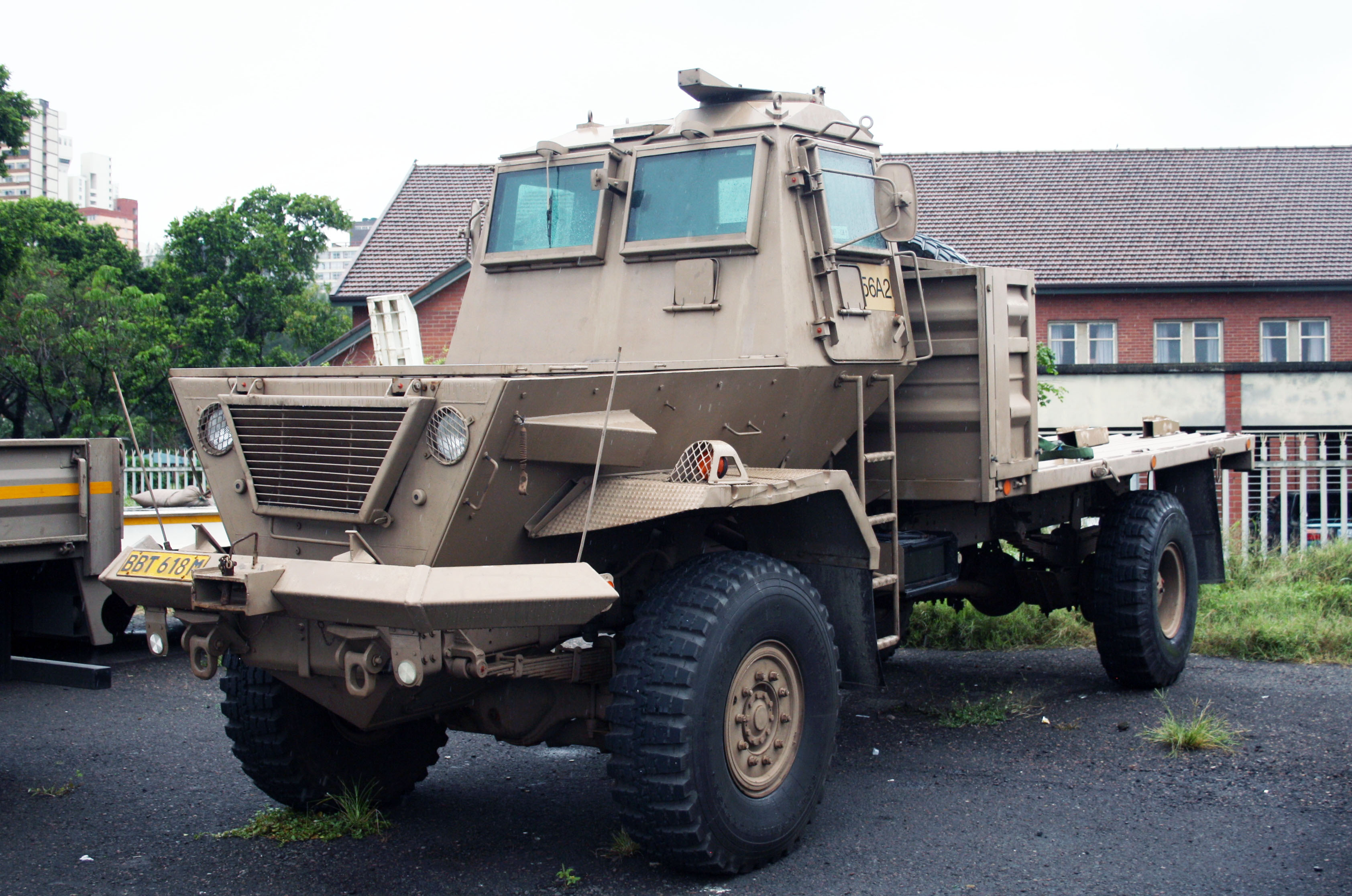
SAMIL 50 with mine protected cab

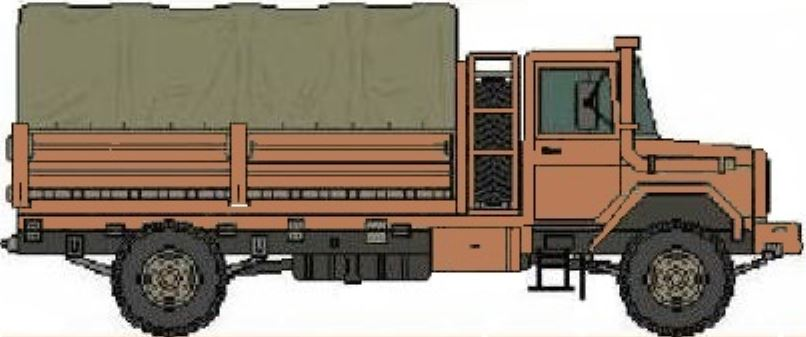
Illustration of SAMIL 50 cargo vehicle

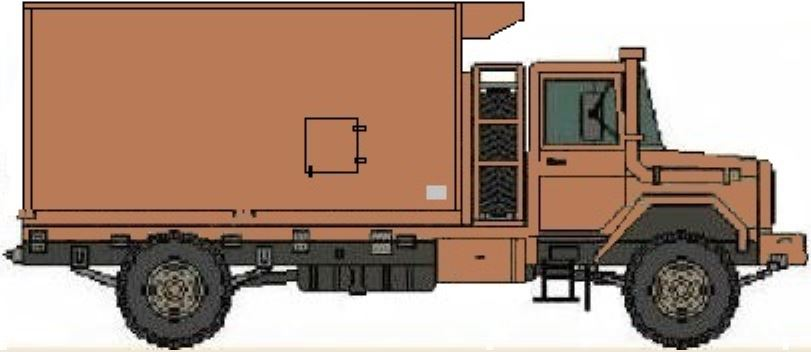
Illustration of SAMIL 50 pantry vehicle

== Citations and References ==
=== Bibliography ===
Jane's (1985). Jane's Military Vehicles and Ground Support Equipment. London: Jane's Publishing Company Ltd. ISBN 0-7106-0811-X.
