= SAMIL 20 =

SAMIL 20 2-ton 4×4 Truck
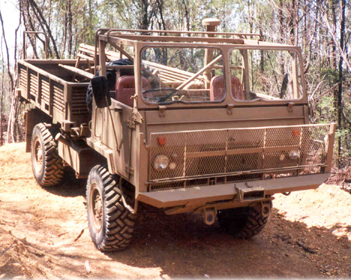
- SAMIL 20 truck
- Type: 2-ton 4×4 truck
- Place of origin: South Africa

Production history
- Designer: Armscor
- Produced: In production up to early 1990s.
- Variants: Cargo (as in photo); Cargo with mine protected cab Rhino: Light armour protected troop carrier Valkiri 127 mm multiple rocket launcher Light repair workshop 20' Container carrier Ambulance

Specifications (SAMIL 20 Cargo)
- Mass: 4,580 kg (10,100 lb) (empty)
- Length: 5.34 m (17.5 ft)
- Width: 2.3 m (7 ft 7 in)
- Height: 2.69 m (8 ft 10 in)
- Crew: 2
- Passengers: 10
- Engine: Atlantis Diesel Engines (ADE) 352N 6 cylinder diesel 106 hp (79 kW)
- Transmission: 5 speed × 2 range
- Suspension: Telescopic hydraulic shock absorbers on leaf springs

The SAMIL 20 is a 2-ton cargo vehicle produced in South Africa in the mid-1980s and was used as the primary light cargo carrier of the South African National Defence Force. The vehicle design is based on the German Mercedes Unimog chassis and Mark I of this vehicle was based on the Magirus Deutz 130M7FAL 4x4 truck. In Mark II, the engine was replaced with an upgraded South African built water cooled diesel engine. The vehicle is still in use with the SANDF.

== Description ==
The SAMIL 20 is a light utility 4×4 military truck designed and built in South Africa for the South African Military forces. The chassis provide the basis for a wide range of cross-country vehicles. It has a forward control cab with a canvas roof and removable side windows. The cargo area is made of pressed steel with low steel sides and may be covered with a canvas top carried on a removable steel frame. A removable bank of back-to-back outward facing seats is fitted on the cargo centre-line accommodating ten seated troops. These seats may be removed and carried on the sides of the cargo area when the vehicle is used for general cargo purposes. The cargo area has four container locking ports to permit 20' containers to be carried. The spare wheel is mounted between the cab and cargo area and a manual light crane is fitted to allow wheel changes by a single operator.

The vehicle has differential locking facilities on both front and rear axles as well as on the transfer box. It has a short wheelbase with a ground clearance of 460mm and permanent 4-wheel drive. The initial Mk I vehicle was powered by a 6-cylinder air-cooled Magirus Deutz engines. This engine was not suited to the heat and dust associated with military use in South West Africa, which lead to the development of the Mk II.

=== Dimensions ===
Data are based on SAMIL 20 cargo version:

- Length: 5,340 mm (210 in)
- Width: 2,300 mm (91 in)
- Height: 2,800 mm (110 in)
- Wheelbase: 2,900 mm (110 in)
- Ground Clearance: 460 mm (18 in)
- Track (Front): 1,894 mm (74.6 in)
- Track (Rear): 1,936 mm (76.2 in)
- Angle of approach: 36°
- Angle of departure: 40°
- Fuel tank capacity: 200 L (44 imp gal; 53 US gal)

=== Weights ===
- Gross vehicle mass: 7,700 kg (17,000 lb)
- Front axle rating: 3,700 kg (8,200 lb)
- Rear axle rating: 4,000 kg (8,800 lb)
- Payload: 3,000 kg (6,600 lb)

=== Specifications ===
- Drive: 4×4
- Engine:
  - Mk I: Deutz F6L 913F
    - Configuration: 6 Cylinders in-line
    - Capacity: 6,128 cc
    - Cooling: Air-cooled
    - Power: 93 kW (124 hp) @ 2650 rpm
    - Torque: 383 Nm @ 1600 rpm
  - Mk II: Mercedes OM 353 (License built Atlantis Diesel Engines ADE352)
    - Configuration: 6 Cylinders in-line
    - Capacity: 5,675 cc
    - Cooling: Water-cooled
    - Power: 96 kW at 2800 rpm
    - Torque: 363 Nm @ 1700 rpm
- Clutch
  - Type: Single dry plate
  - Size: 310 mm (12 in)
- Gearbox
  - Make/Model: ZF S5-35
  - Forward gears: 5 Speed Synchromesh
- Transfer case
  - Make/Model: ZF Z65
  - Type: 2 Speed, Permanent 4×4
  - Differential Lock: Pneumatically operated
- Axles
  - Front Axle: Full floating, double reduction
  - Differential Lock: Pneumatically operated
  - Rear Axle(s): Full floating, double reduction
  - Differential Lock: Pneumatically operated
- Wheels:
  - Single wheel all-round
  - Tyre size: 14.5 × 20" – 12 Ply
- Steering type: Power Assisted
- Brakes
  - Service Brakes: Dual Circuit – air over hydraulics
  - Park Brake: Pneumatically Operated
- Suspension Springs: Semi elliptical leaf springs
- Suspension Shock absorbers: Double acting telescopic hydraulic (Ft & Rr)
- Electrical
  - Voltage: 24V
  - Batteries: 2 × 12V 120 A/h
- Cab
  - Type: Forward Control with Canvas Roof
  - Cab seating: Driver + 1 Assistant
  - Access to Engine: Cab tilts forward
  - Steering: Right-Hand Drive
  - Hard Top Roof

== Variants ==
- Cargo/Personnel Carrier: 2-ton load or 10 back-to-back seated troops.
- LAD – Light Mobile Workshop vehicle for general repairs and vehicle services
- FCP – Artillery Forward Command Post vehicle
- Refuelling vehicle
- Battery Charger vehicle
- Telecommunications Repair
- Field Office
- Ambulance
- Kwevoel: Armoured mine resistant cab with standard cargo area
- Bulldog: Mine resistant armoured personnel carrier
- Ystervark: Kwevoel version with fixed mount 1 × 20 mm GAI-CO1 20mm AA gun on cargo base
- Rhino: Mine resistant armoured personnel carrier (variation of Bulldog)
Variants of the SAMIL 20 vehicle
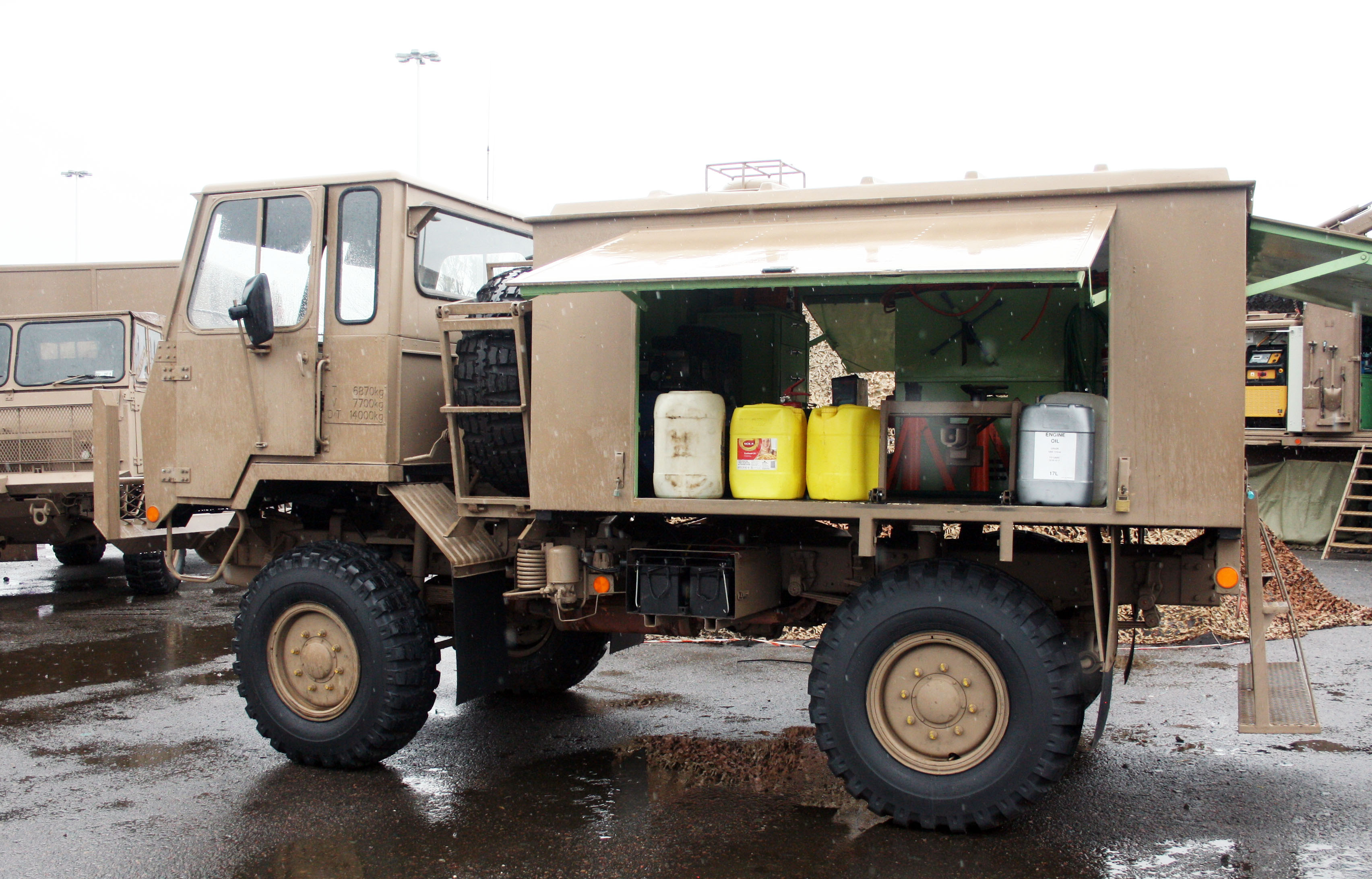
Light workshop mounted on SAMIL 20

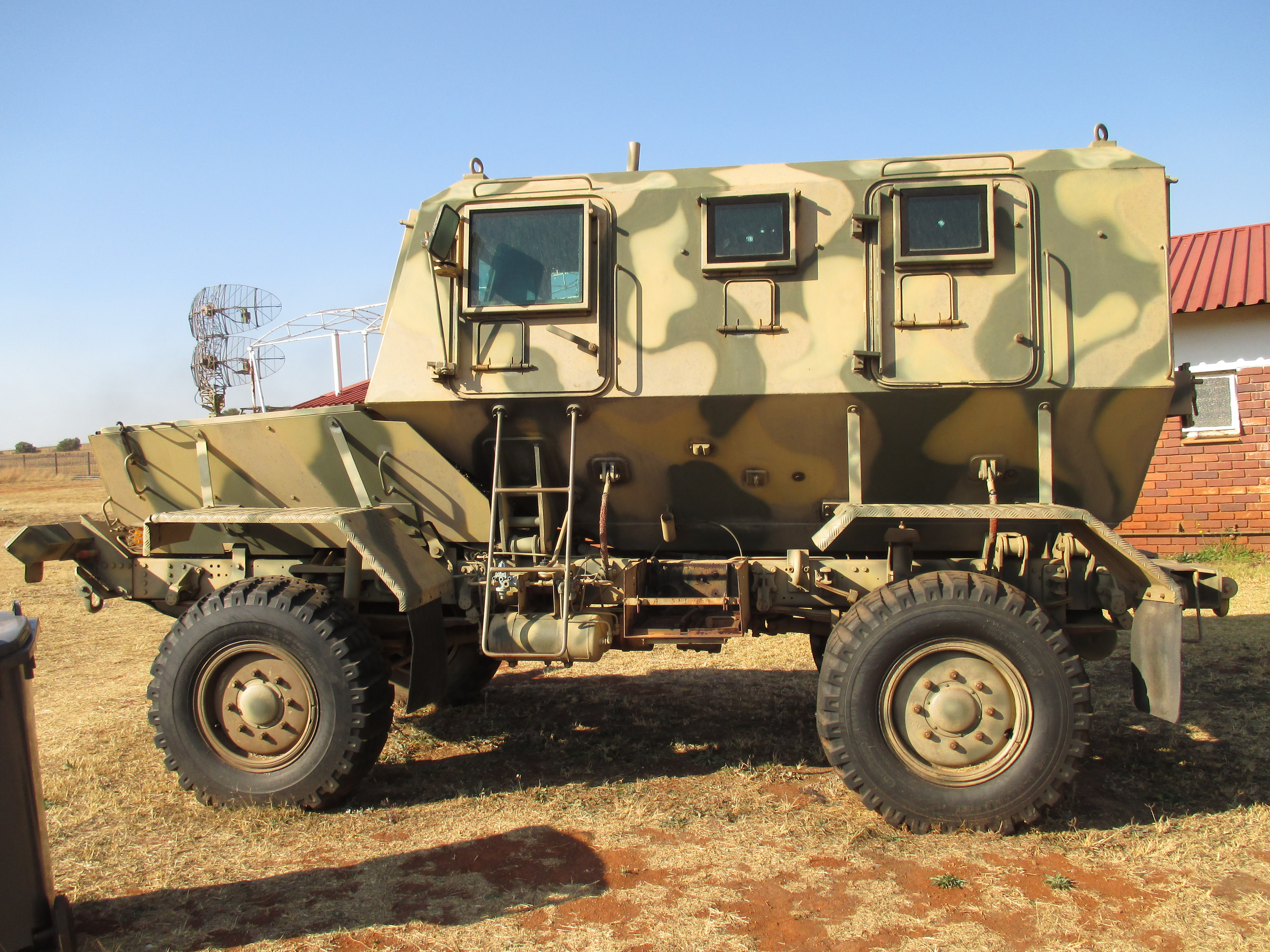
Rhino APC based on SAMIL 20 chassis

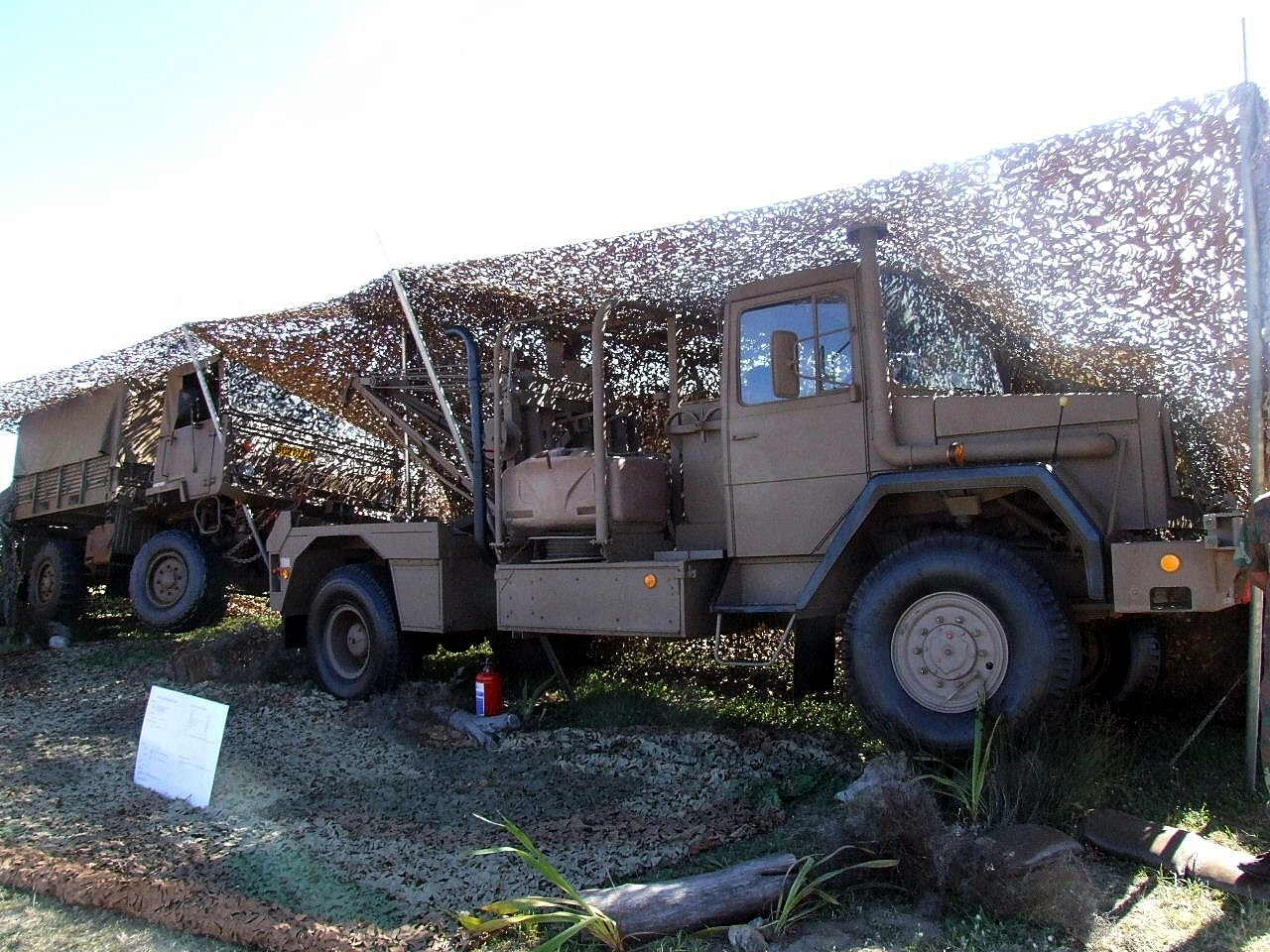
A display showing SAMIL 20 towed by SAMIL 50 recovery vehicle

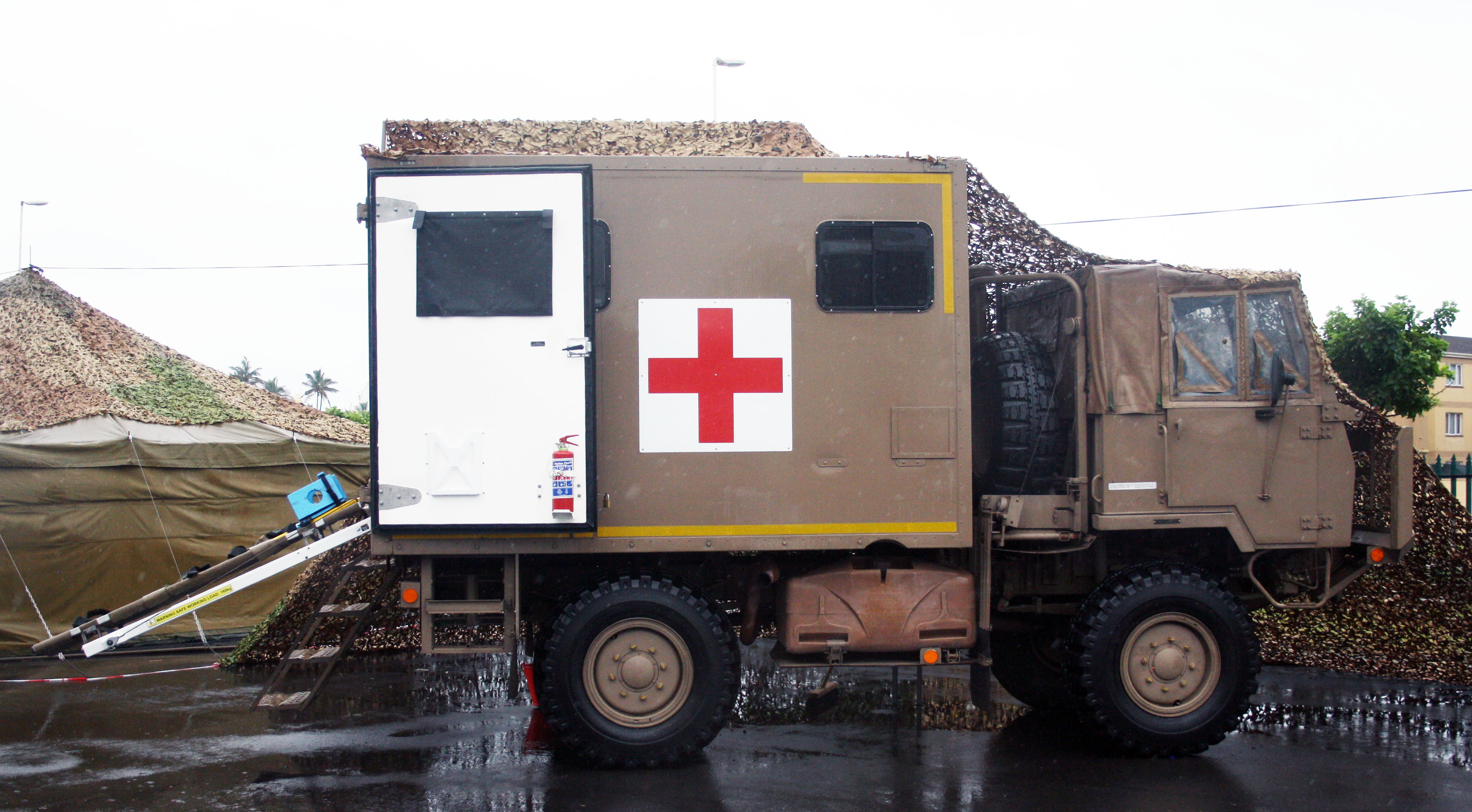
SAMIL 20 ambulance

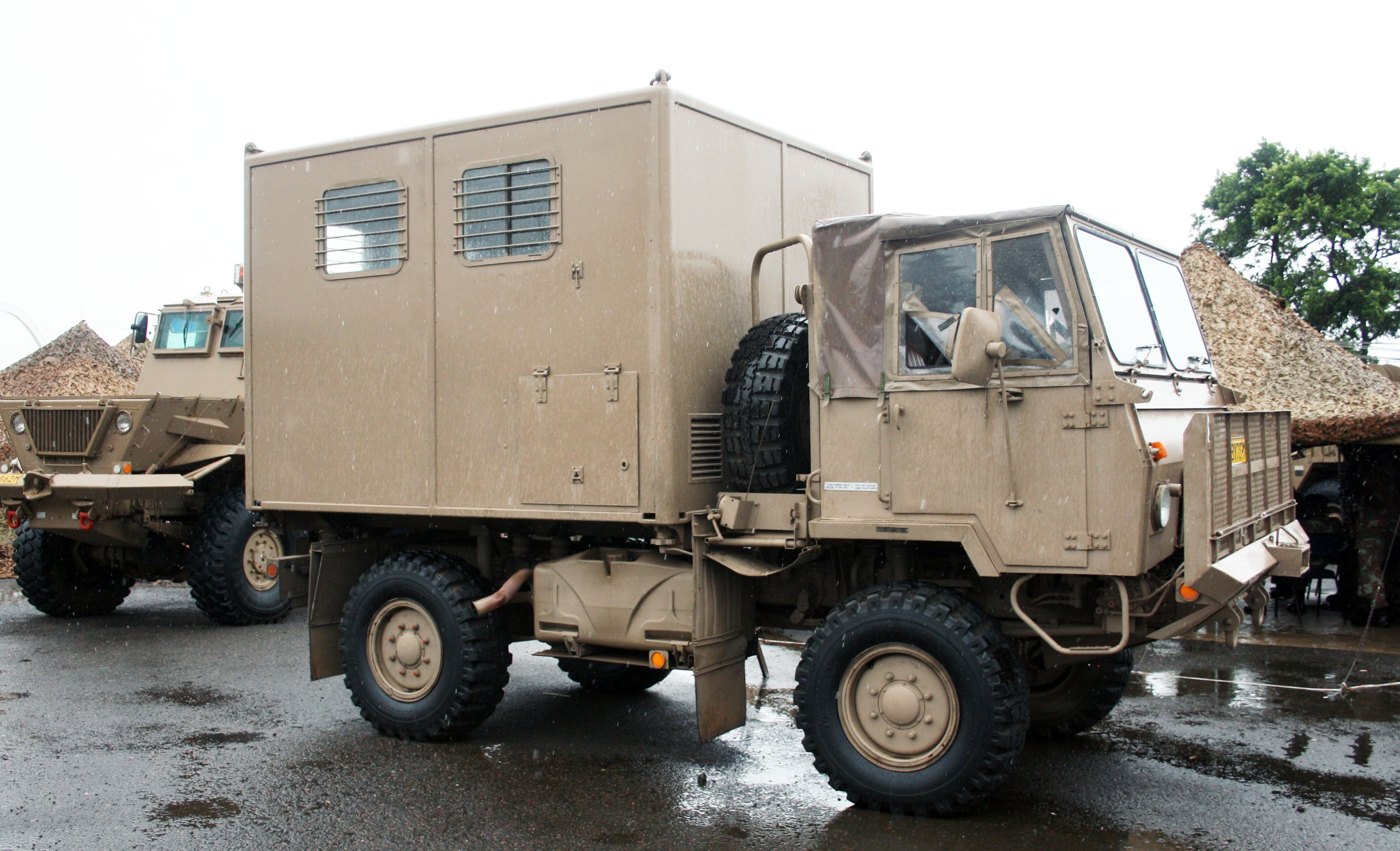
SAMIL 20 mobile office vehicle

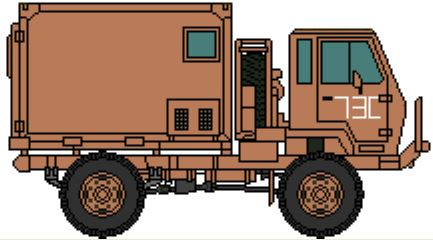
Illustration of SAMIL 20 light workshop vehicle

== Citations and References ==
=== Bibliography ===
Jane's (1985). Jane's Military Vehicles and Ground Support Equipment. London: Jane's Publishing Company. ISBN 0-7106-0811-X.
