= Regiment Natalia =

Natalia Regiment
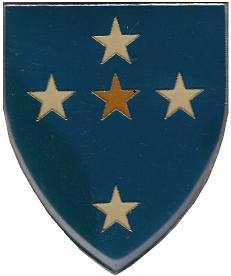
- Natalia Regiment
- Active: 1981-1998
- Country: South Africa
- Allegiance: Republic of South Africa
- Branch: South African Army
- Type: Infantry
- Size: Regiment
- Part of: South African Army Infantry Corps; Army Conventional Reserve
- Garrison/HQ: Pietermaritzburg
- Motto(s): Excellence, nothing less

Natalia Regiment was a Citizen Force infantry regiment of the South African Infantry.

== History ==
=== Origin ===
This unit could trace its origins back to a Natal Law for the protection of the colony, namely Law No 19 of 1862 which instructed the establishment of a rifle association. The name of this rifle association was changed during the UDF era to the Pietermaritzburg Commando. By the 1940s, the commando was headquartered at the Pietermaritzburg Drill Hall and was shared by another unit during that era, namely the Natal Carbineers.

=== From Commando to Regiment ===
In 1981, the commando was converted to a regiment as an infantry battalion under the Citizen Force, being renamed as the Natalia Regiment.

=== Operations ===
Its responsibility included border duties along the Mozambique border with Natal as well as operational duties in South West Africa. The regiment would deploy its tactical HQ to Jozini, for operations around the Makathini Flats.

=== Disbandment ===
Natalia Regiment was disbanded around 1998.

== Commanding officers ==
- Commandant R. Dick 1981-1986
- Commandant P. Hardman 1986-1993
- Lt Colonel P. Brough 1993-1995
- Lt Colonel D. de Beer 1995

Note: This list does not include Officers Commanding of the previous Pietermaritzburg Commando.

== Insignia ==
=== Dress Insignia ===
The regiment did not have a distinctive beret badge and wore the Infantry Corps Springbok badge. The Shoulder flash was inherited from the Pietermaritzburg Commando with the Southern Cross star formation.
