= NASChem Commando =

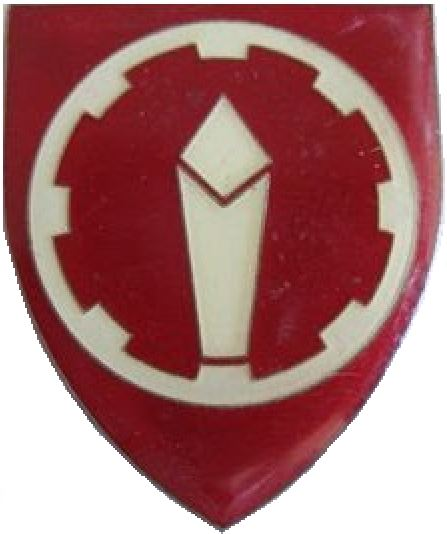
- Industrial Commando Naschem emblem
- Country: South Africa
- Allegiance: Republic of South Africa; Republic of South Africa
- Branch: South African Army; South African Army
- Type: Infantry
- Role: Light Infantry
- Size: One Battalion
- Part of: South African Infantry Corps; Army Territorial Reserve, Group 30
- Garrison/HQ: Initially Lenz then Boskop outside Potchefstroom
- Motto(s): Perseverate en Vincere - Persevere and win

NasChem Commando was a light infantry regiment of the South African Army. It formed part of the South African Army Infantry Formation as well as the South African Territorial Reserve.

== History ==
=== Origin ===
==== Industrial Protection Commando ====
NasChem started as an explosives depot for the gold industry around 1896 at Lenz, near Johannesburg.

During World War 2, it produced about 25 million pieces of ammunition for the campaign in North Africa.

The facility was reactivated around 1970 for the design, development and manufacture mainly of artillery armaments.

=== Operations ===
==== With the SADF ====
As the facility was considered a National Key Point and the personnel of the facility had military service requirements to fulfill, it made sense to activate a commando and in doing so assist in the security of the facility.

The unit, initially at company strength reported to Regiment President Kruger.

The new commando was finally unit status on 14 May 1984 and established its own headquarters at Lenz, falling under the command of Group 18.

By 1986, NasChem moved its factory to Boskop, Potchefstroom and the commando then reported to North West Command.

During 1992, NasChem became a division of Denel Ordnance.

==== With the SANDF ====
===== Disbandment =====
Unlike other Commando units disbanded after a decision by South African President Thabo Mbeki to disband all Commando Units, this unit had closed earlier as Denel no longer required it and had privatised its security.

The Commando system had been phased out between 2003 and 2008 "because of the role it played in the apartheid era", according to the Minister of Safety and Security Charles Nqakula.

== Insignia ==
The design of the insignia depicts the front view of a cannon barrel.

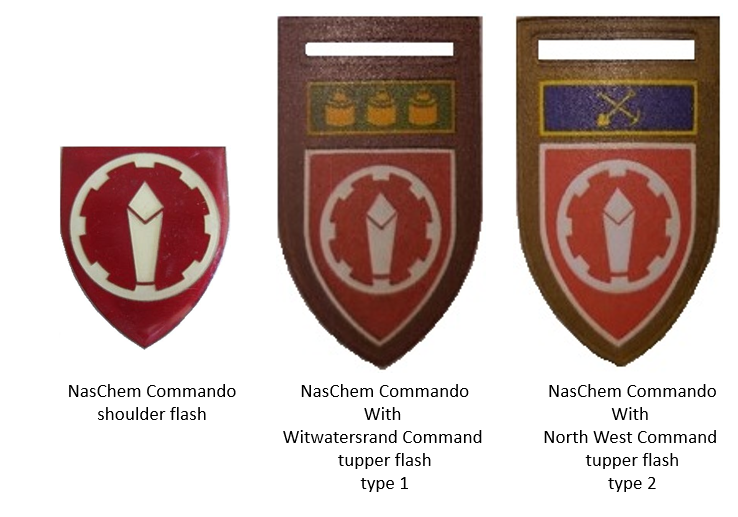
SADF era Naschem Commando insignia

== See also ==
- South African Commando System
