= 117 Battalion =

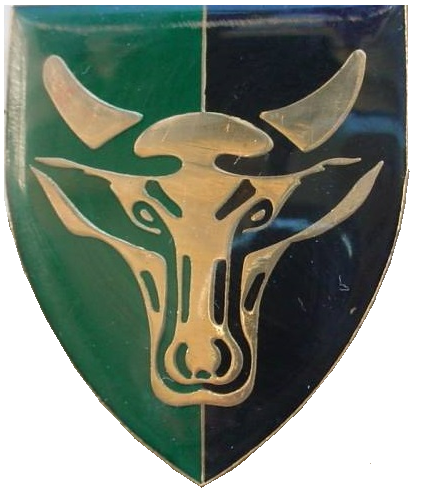
- 117 Battalion emblem
- Active: 1993-1997
- Country: South Africa
- Branch: South African Army
- Type: Motorised infantry
- Part of: South African Army Infantry Corps
- Garrison/HQ: Soekmekaar
- Motto(s): Tiro sano
- Equipment: Buffel APC, Samil 20

Commanders
- Current commander: Lt Col L Scheepers, Lt Col P de Vos Viljoen, Lt Col T Snyman

Insignia
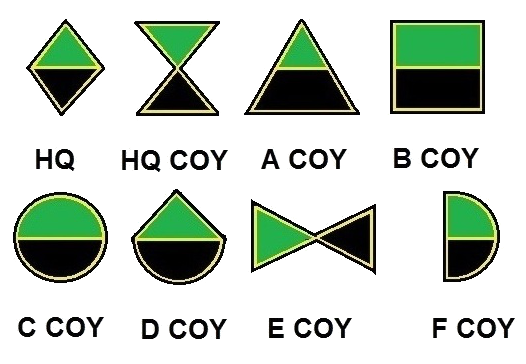
- Company level insignia

- SA Motorised Infantry beret bar circa 1992: SA Motorised Infantry beret bar

111 Battalion was a motorised infantry unit of the South African Army.

== History ==
=== Origin of the black battalions ===
By the late 1970s the South African government had abandoned its opposition to arming black soldiers.

By early 1979, the government approved a plan to form a number of regional African battalions, each with a particular ethnic identity, which would serve in their homeland or under regional SADF commands.

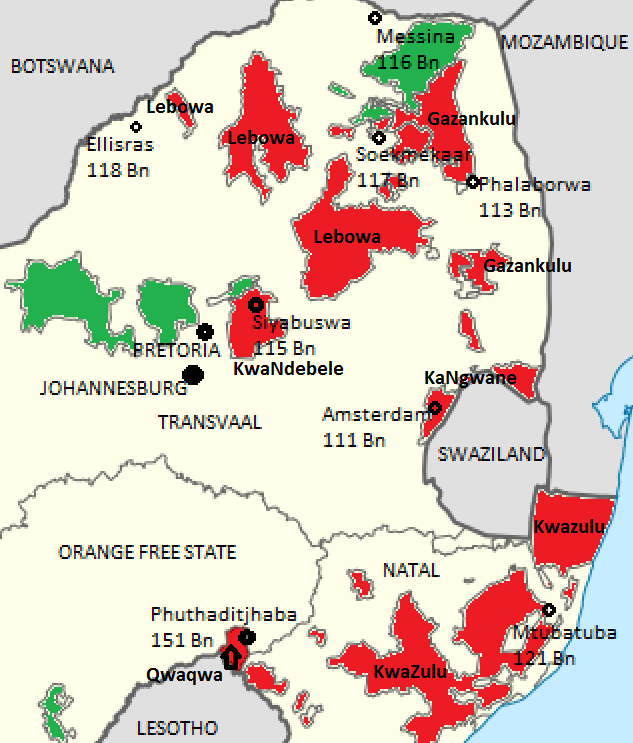
Location of the 100 Battalions in relation to their respective homelands

=== Development of the Lebowa Defence Force ===
Two additional Northern Sotho Battalions were established, the 117 and the 118. Troops for 117 SA Battalion were recruited from the self-governing territory of Lebowa.

=== Higher Command ===
117 Battalion initially resorted under the command of Group 45 but was eventually transferred to Group 14 at Pietersburg.

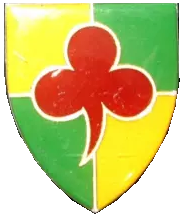
SADF Group 14 emblem

The unit's HQ were situated in Soekmekaar with companies "deployed" in "steunpunte" or platoon base's throughout Lebowa. Alpha Company had its HQ in Seshego at the platoon one base, platoon two was based in Mankweng (close to the University of the North and Moria mountain of the ZCC) and platoon 3 was based in Ga-Matapo.

=== Disbandment ===
117 Battalion was converted into a training unit around 1997 and was finally amalgamated into 3 South African Infantry Battalion as part of the new SANDF.

== Insignia ==
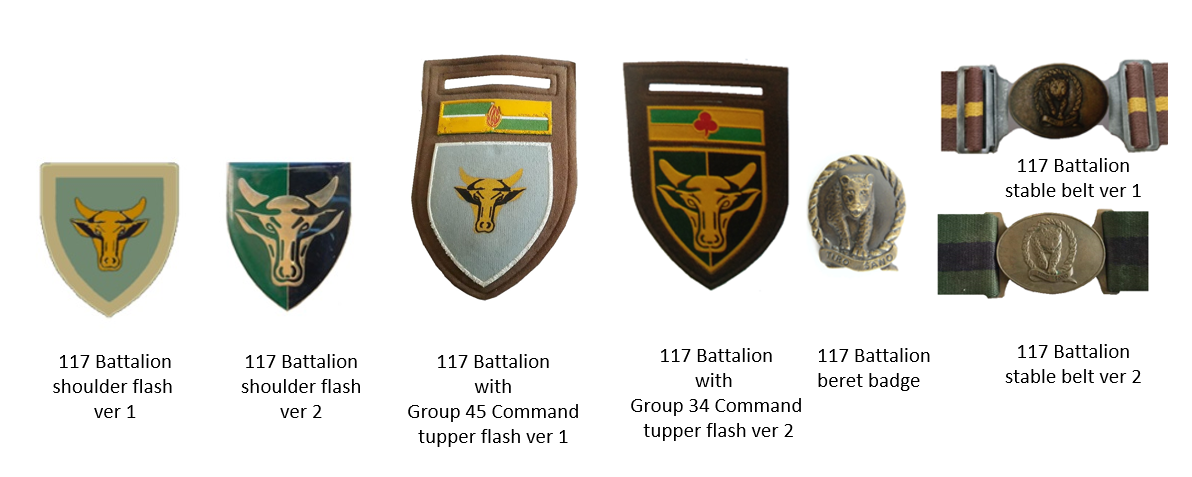
SADF era 117 Battalion insignia

== Notes ==
Peled, A. A question of Loyalty Military Manpower Policy in Multiethinic States, Cornell University Press, 1998, ISBN 0-8014-3239-1 Chapter 2: South Africa: From Exclusion to Inclusion
