= Regiment Louw Wepener/Oos Vrystaat =

Regiment Louw Wepener / Oos Vrystaat
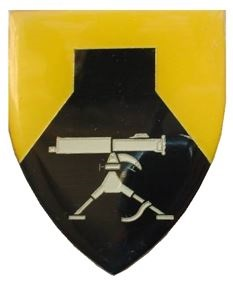
- Regiment Louw Wepener / Oos Vrystaat Emblem
- Active: 1934
- Allegiance: Allied forces; South Africa
- Branch: South African Army
- Size: Battalion
- Part of: South African Infantry Corps; Army Conventional Reserve
- Garrison/HQ: Ladybrand Bethlehem
- Motto(s): "Ons vir jou Suid Afrika" (Us for you, South Africa)
- Battle honours

Regiment Louw Wepener was an infantry battalion of the South African Army. As a reserve force unit, it had a status roughly equivalent to that of a British Army Reserve or United States Army National Guard unit.

== History ==
=== Union Defence Force Origins ===
Regiment Louw Wepener was one of six Afrikaans-speaking Citizen Force regiments established in 1934 as part of the expansion of the then Union Defence Force of South Africa. The regiment was named after the Free State commandant, Louw Wepener, who was killed in 1865 during the 2nd Orange Free State—Basuto War at Thaba Bosiu, the former mountain stronghold of Moshoeshoe, founder of the Basuto nation.

The regiment's headquarters was located originally in Ladybrand while recruits were enlisted from the entire Orange Free State province. The regiment was initially detached to the 4th SA Infantry Brigade.

=== World War II ===
During the Second World War, Regiments Louw Wepener and De Wet were absorbed into Regiment President Steyn at the start of the war, all three emanated from the Orange Free State. This regiment then served as a machine gun battalion with the 1st South African Division in North Africa from 1941 to 1942. A Major J J W Swanepoel of Regiment Louw Wepener served as this unit's second-in-command and by 1943, a Lt Col Nel took command of a further amalgamated Regiment Botha/ President Steyn when it was converted to a tank regiment and redeployed to Italy.

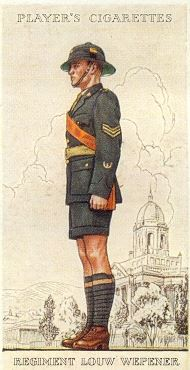
Regiment Louw Wepener World War Two era cigarette card

=== Post War Citizen Force Regiment Development ===
By 1946, Regiment Louw Wepener was resuscitated as a Citizen Force unit and converted again to mechanised infantry. At this stage, the regiments HQ had moved to Bethlehem.

=== Name change ===
In 1960, it became Regiment Oos-Vrystaat (Regiment East Free State), but the original designation, Regiment Louw Wepener, was again re-adopted by 1966. The regiment at this stage had become motorised infantry. The regiment served under this name until well into the 1990s, when it was absorbed, together with Regiment Dan Pienaar, into Regiment Bloemspruit.

=== Battle honours ===
The regiment took part in the battles of Gazala line and the defence of El Alamein.

The regiment also served in numerous deployments in the Border War in SWA/Namibia

== Regimental emblems ==
An image of Thaba Bosiu forms the background of the regimental badge. A Vickers machine gun is superimposed on the mountain and the name 'Thaba Bosigo' appears below— this being the original Afrikaans spelling of the name of the mountain. Below the name is a shield with crossed spears above a scroll bearing the words 'Reg Louw Wepener Reg'.

=== Dress Insignia ===
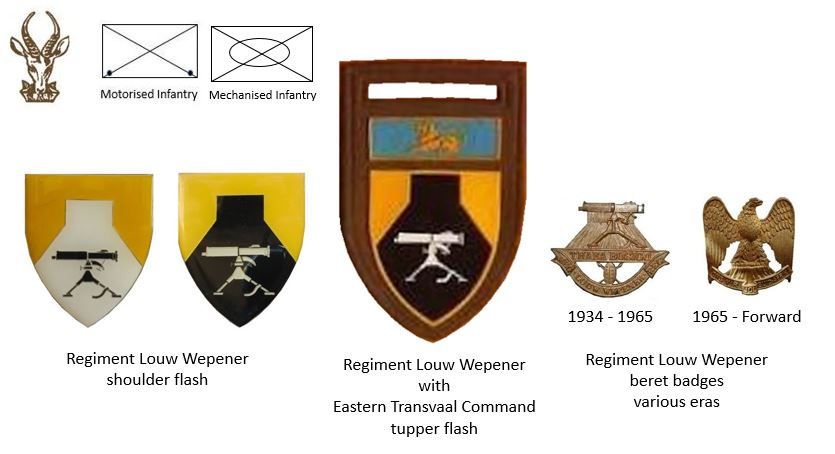
SADF era Regiment Louw Wepener insignia
