= Regiment University of Stellenbosch =

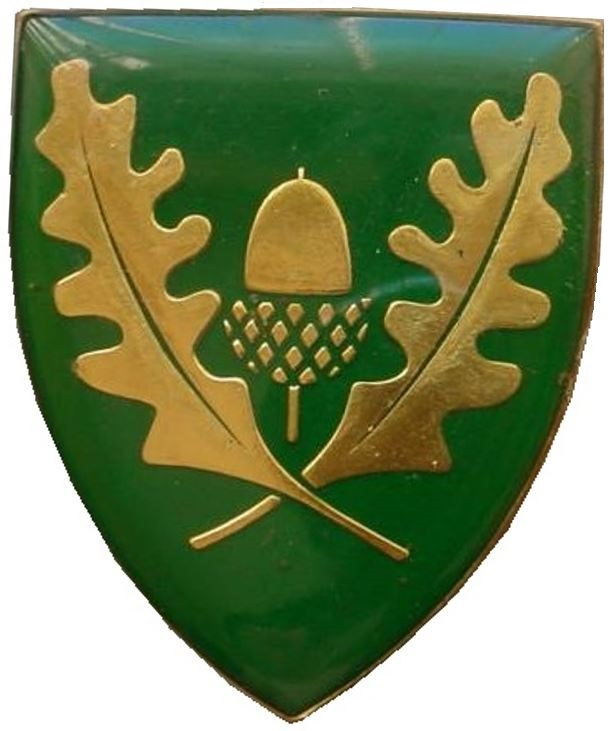
- SADF Regiment University of Stellenbosch
- Active: 1960 to 1970
- Country: South Africa
- Allegiance: Republic of South Africa
- Branch: South African Army
- Type: Reserve Anti-Aircraft
- Part of: South African Army Infantry Formation; Army Conventional Reserve
- Garrison/HQ: Stellenbosch
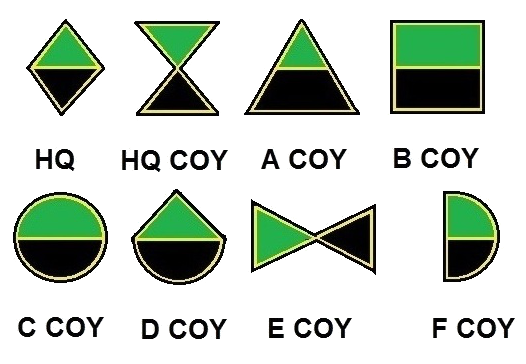
- Company level insignia

- SA Motorised Infantry beret bar circa 1992: SA Motorised Infantry beret bar

Regiment University of Stellenbosch was an infantry regiment of the South African Army. As a reserve unit, it had a status roughly equivalent to that of a British Army Reserve or United States Army National Guard unit. It was part of the South African Army Infantry Corps.

== History ==
=== Origins ===
In the late 1950s in South Africa, military units were attached to each large university. The University of Stellenbosch acquired an infantry capability transferred from the previous Regiment Tobie Muller itself dating from November 1953.

The regiment was renamed in January 1960. The concept was for long term students to complete their obligatory military training in these units. Training would also be organised so as not to unduly interfere with university work.

=== Operations ===
The Regiment was deployed for border duty in South West Africa as well as for internal unrest mainly in the Cape Province throughout the 1970s.

== Regimental Emblems ==
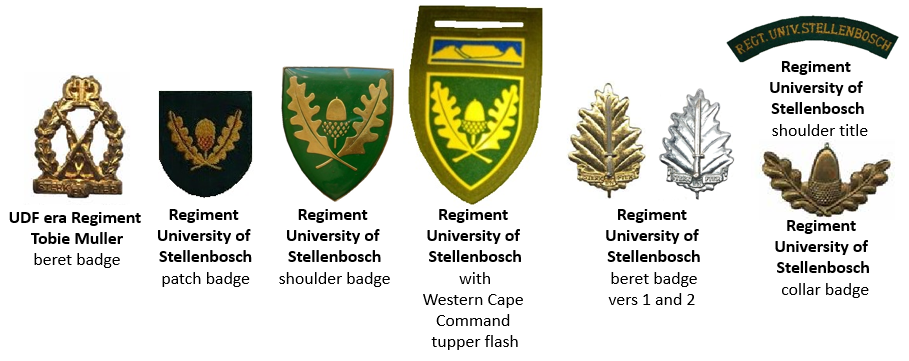
SADF Regiment University of Stellenbosch insignia
