= Mangaung Regiment =

Regiment Bloemspruit Mangaung Regiment
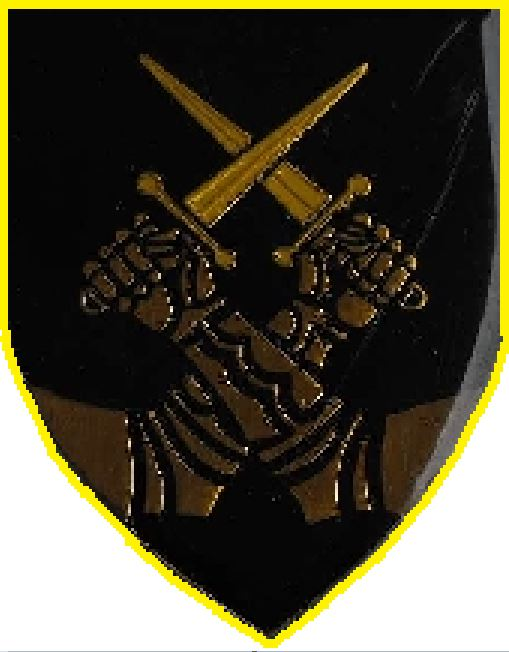
- Regiment Bloemspruit emblem
- Active: 1 January 1964 to present
- Country: South Africa
- Allegiance: Republic of South Africa; Republic of South Africa
- Branch: South African Army; South African Army
- Type: Infantry
- Role: Motorised infantry
- Size: One battalion
- Part of: South African Infantry Formation; Army Conventional Reserve
- Garrison/HQ: Bloemfontein
- Mottos: Wakker en trou (Awake and loyal)
- Anniversaries: 1 January (Regimental Day)

Insignia
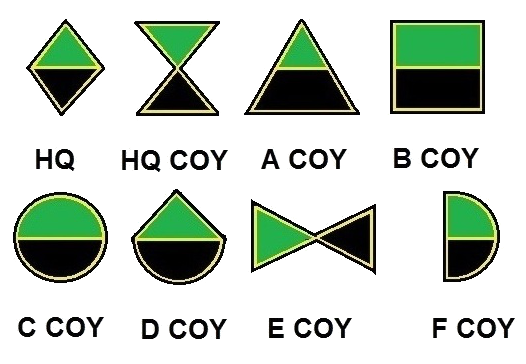
- Company level Insignia

- SA Motorised Infantry beret bar circa 1992: SA Motorised Infantry beret bar
- Abbreviation: MAUR

The Mangaung Regiment (formerly Regiment Bloemspruit) is a reserve infantry regiment of the South African Army.

== History ==
=== Origin ===
In 1964, Regiment Bloemspruit with its HQ in Bloemfontein, was established on 1 January as the first Citizen Force Infantry Regiment in the then Orange Free State. The total strength of the Regiment at that stage was 15 members. The then Minister of Defence and later State President, the late Mr J.J. (Jim) Fouché, was actively involved in the establishment of the Regiment.

=== Colours ===
The Regimental Colour was presented to the regiment by the then State President Mr J.J. Fouché

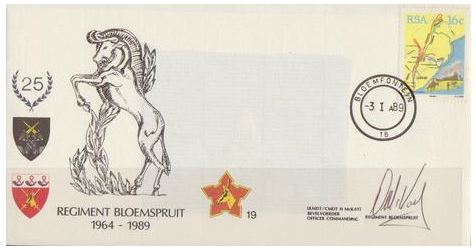
SADF Regiment Bloemspruit Commemorative letter

On 29 January 1981, the Freedom of the City was conferred on the regiment by the City Council of Bloemfontein, which the unit exercised for the first time on 6 March 1982. The regiment served in the South African Border War in the 1970s and 1980s.

=== Amalgamation ===
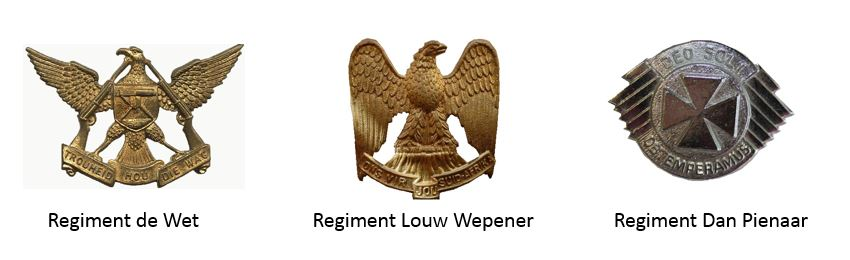
On 1 April 1997, Regiment Louw Wepener (Bethlehem), Regiment De Wet (Kroonstad) and Regiment Dan Pienaar (Bloemfontein) were absorbed into Regiment Bloemspruit.

=== Regiment Bloemspruit post 1994 in the SANDF ===
Today the Regiment is still active and well with a total strength of more than 500 members. The motto of the Regiment is "Wakker en Trou", meaning Alert and Loyal. A traditional toast, only to be introduced at very special occasions and a traditional way of greeting (only between members of the Regiment) were introduced in 1994.

In 2006, Regiment Bloemspruit was deployed internally at Madimbo in the Limpopo Province as well as in the Eastern Cape with the swine fever outbreak. During April to June of the same year, and January and February 2008 Regiment Bloemspruit participated in ATR/ACR (Army Territorial Reserve to Army Conventional Reserve) Conversion Training with Kimberly Regiment. The regiment presented the penultimate ATR/ACR Conversion Course during January/February 2009.

2009 saw, Bravo Company (B-Coy) under command of Maj Dawid Vos, be attached to 121 SA Infantry Battalion and successfully deployed on a Peace Keeping Mission to the Darfur Region of Sudan from October 2009 to May 2010.

With the allocation of Military Skills Development System members with a five-year Reserve Force obligation, the regiment has been continually rejuvenated.

==== Name change ====
In August 2019, 52 Reserve Force units had their names changed to reflect the diverse military history of South Africa. Regiment Bloemspruit became the Mangaung Regiment, and have 3 years to design and implement new regimental insignia.

== Officers Commanding ==
Leadership
From	Honorary Colonel	To	Ribbon
	No known incumbents		
From	Officer Commanding	To	Ribbon
1964	Cmdt J.M. Wentzel	c. 1966	
1966	Cmdt J.A. van Huysteen	c. 1968	
1968	Cmdt I.M.H. Pieterse	c. 1976	
1976	Cmdt C.J. Horn	c. 1982	
1982	Cmdt H. McKay	c. 1991	
1991	Lt Col E. Horn	c. nd	
From	Regimental Sergeant Major	To	Ribbon
c. xxx	xxx	c. xxx	

== Regimental Sergeants Majors ==
The first Regimental Sergeant Major (RSM) was WO1 A. Horn (1964–1969), followed by WO1 J.F. Fivaz (1969–1984) and WO1 K.J.H. van Zyl (1984-1996). The present RSM (since 1996) is Master Warrant Officer (MWO) C.J. De Bruyn.

== Regimental Symbols ==
=== Previous Dress Insignia ===
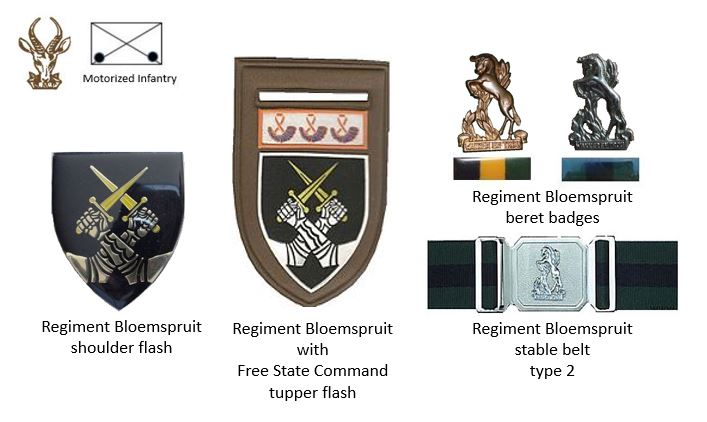
SADF era Regiment Bloemspruit insignia

=== Current Dress Insignia ===
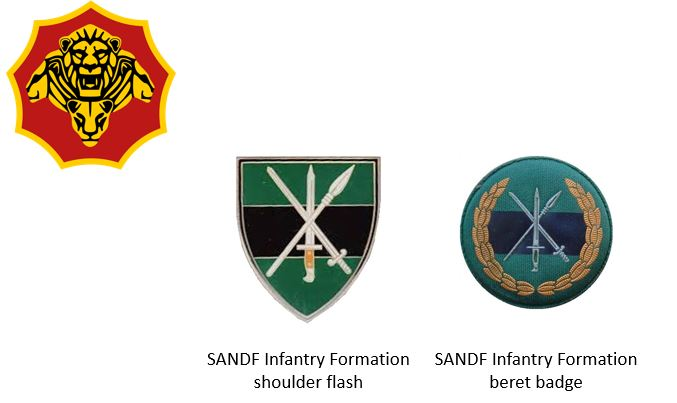
SANDF era Infantry Formation insignia
