= Regiment Dan Pienaar =

Infantry battalion of the South African Army

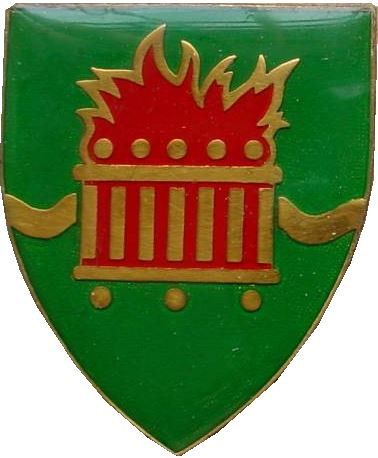
- Regiment Dan Pienaar emblem
- Active: 1 June 1976
- Allegiance: Allied forces; South Africa
- Branch: South African Army
- Size: Battalion
- Part of: South African Infantry Corps; Army Conventional Reserve
- Garrison/HQ: Bloemfontein

Commanders
- OC 1970s: Commandant Downs
- OC 1980's: Commandant E. Tordiffe

Regiment Dan Pienaar was an infantry battalion of the South African Army. As a reserve force unit, it had a status roughly equivalent to that of a British Army Reserve or United States Army National Guard unit.

== History ==
=== Origins ===
Regiment Dan Pienaar was initially formed as 2 Regiment Bloemspruit as an offshoot of Regiment Bloemspruit (Renamed 1 Regiment Bloemspruit, but reverted after 2RBS was renamed.).

=== Renamed ===
Subsequently, it was decided to rename 2RBS after the famous World War II general and Free Stater, General Dan Pienaar on 1 June 1976, thus the unit could begin to form its own history and traditions.

=== Disbanded/Amalgamated ===
After being disbanded in 1997 the remaining members were incorporated into Regiment Bloemspruit. The part-time units, Regiments De Wet (Kroonstad), Louw Wepener (Bethlehem) and Dan Pienaar (Bloemfontein) were amalgamated with Regiment Bloemspruit by 1 April. The name Regiment Bloemspruit was retained under the command of the Commanding General, Free State Command."

=== Battle honours ===
The unit also served in numerous deployments in the Border War in SWA/Namibia

=== Freedom of the City ===
Freedom of the city of Bloemfontein in 1981

== Regimental emblems ==
=== Dress Insignia ===
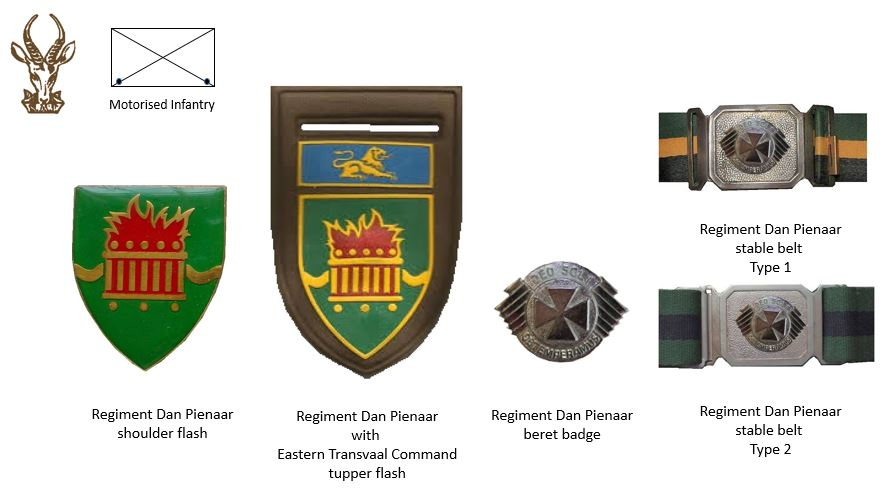
SADF era Regiment Dan Pienaar insignia

== Roll of Honour ==
Regiment Dan Pienaar has one Honoris Crux on the Roll of Honour: Delport J C Rfn. 13 September 1978. Here is his citation:

DELPORT Rfn Johanes Cornelius, (780913) Regt Dan Pienaar, SAI, Rifleman Delport was a member of a platoon of Regiment Dan Pienaar, which was attached to Regiment Bloemspruit from 20 July to 8 Oct 1978, in the 54 Bn section of the border. At 20hOO on 13 September 1978 his platoon was attacked by terrorists near Ushuti Dam while in a temporary base. Two enemy flares fell nearby and were followed by a hail of bullets. Delport crawled out under fire and threw sand over the burning flares until they were extinguished. One of his platoon then panicked, jumped up and ran towards the enemy. Delport ran after him, tackled him and dragged him back to his position. Before they regained their lines Delport was wounded in the back.

== General references ==
- Pollock, A.M.. "Pienaar of Alamein". 1943. Cape Times. The biography of Major-General Dan Pienaar, a South African officer on the battle fields of Abyssinia and Egypt.
- Malherbe, E.G. Never a Dull Moment. Reminiscences of his distinguished career as an educationalist, Director of Census & Statistics, as well as Director of Military Intelligence for SA during World War II. Reveals some intimate views of Generals Smuts, Dan Pienaar, Alexander, Evered Poole, and Klopper etc. Timmins. Cape Town 1981.
