= CALR =

CALR may refer to:

- Calreticulin, a protein that in humans is encoded by the CALR gene.
- Chief Albert Luthuli Regiment, an infantry regiment of the South African Army
- Computer-assisted legal research, a mode of legal research
- Centre for Applied Language Research at the University of Southampton
- Advisory Commission on Religious Freedom, part of the Spanish Ministry of Justice
