= Pietermaritzburg Commando =

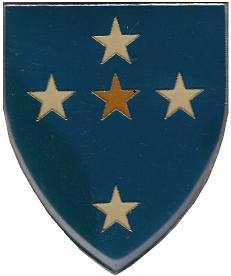
- Pietermaritzburg Commando
- Active: 1940 – 1981
- Country: South Africa
- Allegiance: Republic of South Africa; Republic of South Africa
- Branch: South African Army; South African Army
- Type: Infantry
- Role: Light Infantry
- Size: One Battalion
- Part of: South African Infantry Corps; Army Territorial Reserve
- Garrison/HQ: Pietermaritzburg

Pietermaritzburg Commando, later Natalia Regiment, was a light infantry regiment of the South African Army. It formed part of the South African Army Infantry Formation as well as the South African Territorial Reserve.

== History ==
=== Origin ===
This unit could trace its antecedents back to a Natal Law for the protection of the colony, namely Law No 19 of 1862 which instructed the establishment of a rifle association.

=== Operations ===
==== With the UDF ====
The name of this rifle association was changed during the UDF era to the Pietermaritzburg Commando.

By the 1940s, the commando was headquartered at the Pietermaritzburg Drill Hall and was shared by another unit during that era, namely the Natal Carbineers.

==== With the SADF ====
===== From Commando to Regiment =====
In 1981, the commando was converted to a regiment as an infantry battalion under the Citizen Force, being renamed as the Natalia Regiment.

== See also ==
- South African Commando System
