= 14 South African Infantry Battalion =

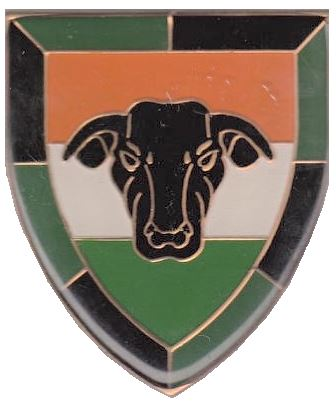
- 14 SAI emblem
- Active: 1 January 1994 to present
- Country: South Africa
- Branch: South African Army
- Type: Motorised infantry
- Part of: South African Army Infantry Formation
- Garrison/HQ: Mthatha, Eastern Cape
- Motto: Courage Sans Peur (Courage without Fear)
- Equipment: Mamba APC

Insignia
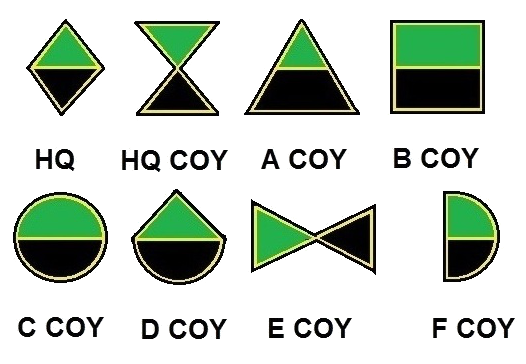
- Company level insignia

14 South African Infantry Battalion is a motorised infantry unit of the South African Army.

== History ==
=== Origin ===
14 SAI was established on 1 January 1994, at Mthatha, Eastern Cape as a result of the amalgamation of the old Transkei Defence Force into the SANDF.

=== Amalgamation ===
Another unit, 13 SAI was amalgamated with 14 SAI by the late 1990s.

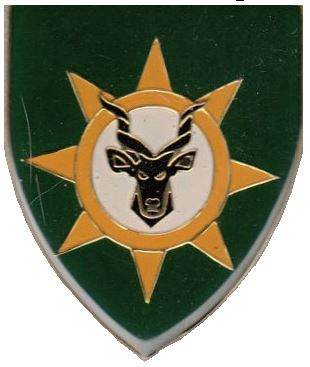
13 SAI emblem, 13 SAI was amalgamated with 14 SAI

=== Freedom of the city ===
14 SAI marked freedom of entry into Mthatha on 30 July 2011 in which the Mayor of King Sabata Dalindyebo Municipality, officiated.

== Insignia ==
=== Previous Dress Insignia ===
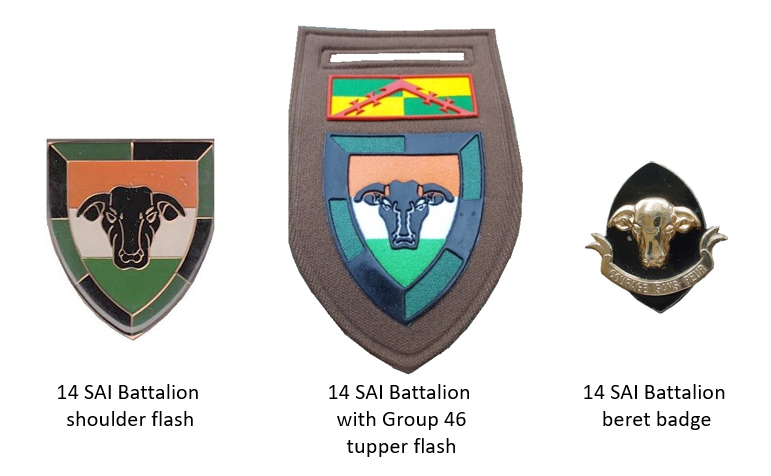
Early SANDF 14 SAI insignia

=== Current Dress Insignia ===
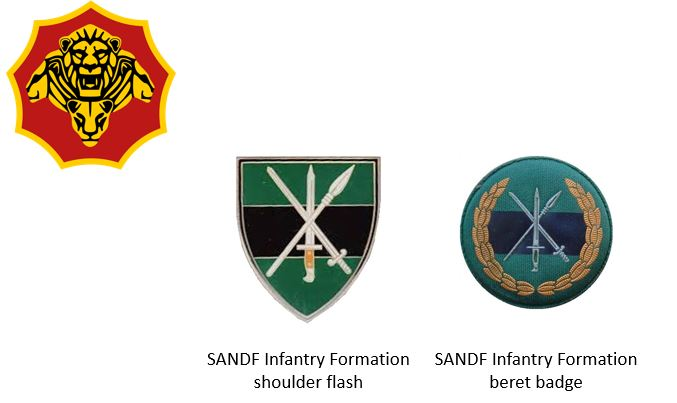
SANDF era Infantry Formation insignia

== SANDF's Motorised Infantry ==
SANDF's Motorised Infantry is transported mostly by Samil trucks, Mamba APC's or other un-protected motor vehicles. Samil 20,50 and 100 trucks transport soldiers, towing guns, and carrying equipment and supplies. Samil trucks are all-wheel drive, in order to have vehicles that function reliably in extremes of weather and terrain. Motorised infantry have an advantage in mobility allowing them to move to critical sectors of the battlefield faster, allowing better response to enemy movements, as well as the ability to outmaneuver the enemy.

== Leadership ==
Leadership
| From | Honorary Colonel | To | Ribbon |
|---|---|---|---|
| | No known incumbents | | |
| From | Officer Commanding | To | Ribbon |
| 2010 | Lt Col T.D. Oss | c. nd | |
| From | Regimental Sergeants Major | To | Ribbon |
| | No known incumbents | | |
