= 3 Parachute Battalion =

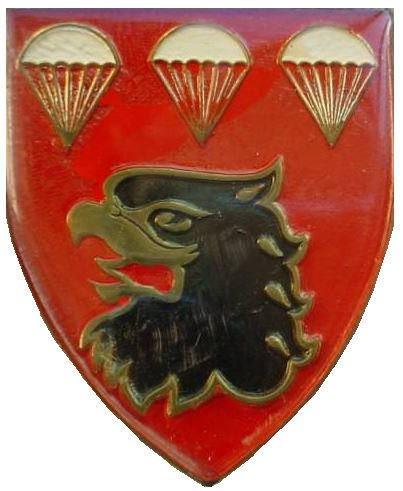
- SANDF 3 Para emblem
- Active: July 1977 – present
- Country: South Africa
- Allegiance: Republic of South Africa; Republic of South Africa
- Branch: South African Army; South African Army
- Type: Infantry (Paratroopers)
- Role: Airborne infantry
- Size: Battalion
- Part of: South African Infantry Corps; Army Conventional Reserve
- Garrison/HQ: Tempe, Bloemfontein
- Nickname: Parabats

3 Parachute Battalion is a Citizen Force paratroop unit of the South African Army. It was established in July 1977 within the formation of the Parachute Battalion. Later it was a battalion within 44 Parachute Brigade. As a reserve unit, it has a status roughly equivalent to that of a British Army Reserve or United States Army National Guard unit.

== History ==
With the implementation of one year National Service in South Africa in 1968, 1 Parachute Battalion struggled to administer the Permanent Force and the Citizen Force Parabats. To prevent the loss of these trained national servicemen at the end of their one-year service to other units of the South African Defence Force, it was decided to form a new citizen force parachute unit to take these men. The battalion was formed at Tempe in July 1977 of five rifle companies.

On 20 April 1978, 3 Parachute Battalion and other parachute units became part of the newly formed 44 Parachute Brigade.

=== Operations ===
3 Parachute Battalion would take part in Operation Reindeer in Angola during 1978, Elements of this battalion took part in the parachute drop over Cassinga.

== Leadership ==
Leadership
From	Honorary Colonel	To	Ribbon
	No known incumbents		
From	Officer Commanding	To	Ribbon
	No known incumbents		
From	Regimental Sergeants Major	To	Ribbon
	No known incumbents		

== Battle honours ==
Battle Honours
Awarded to 3 Parachute Battalion
