= South African Army Training Formation =

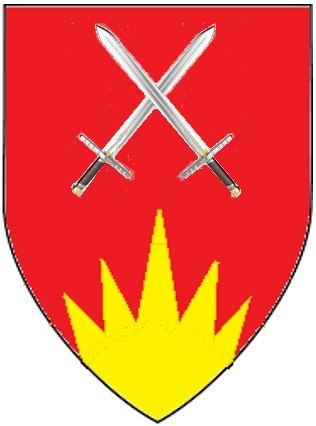
- SANDF Army Training Formation emblem
- Active: 1999 to date
- Country: South Africa
- Allegiance: South African Army
- Branch: South African Army
- Type: Military Training
- Part of: South African Army

The South African Army Training Formation is the controlling entity of all South African Army training units. The Formation was established in April 1999 and mandated to provide, maintain and sustain landward common training to the SA Army.

== History of Military Training in South Africa ==
=== Dutch East India Company ===
The Dutch East India Company in 1786 established a training centre in South Africa for military cadets, from the local population. However, the school did not reach the stage where it functioned properly, owing to the financial difficulties and eventual collapse of the Dutch East India Company.

=== Union of South Africa ===
After Union in 1910, Chapter IV of the South Africa Defence Act, 1912, made provision for the South African Military College. In the Annual Reports of the Department of Defence and Executive Commands for the year ended 30 June 1913, the College was referred to as "an institution or group of institutions, known as the South African Military Schools." The report added that the institution ".At first the only branches of the College which were in existence were:

- the General Branch (styled the South African Military School) and
- the Musketry Branch (called the South African School of Musketry).

The S.A. Military School was established on 1 July 1912 at the Old Presidency in Bloemfontein. On the same date, a class of 51 officers assembled there to attend a course. The Old Presidency had been selected to accommodate the Military School until such time as buildings, which were more suitable, became available at Tempe. On 1 April 1913, the S.A. School of Musketry was opened at Tempe and the first course, for rifle instructors, began on the 13th of that month. The School of Musketry later became the nucleus of the Weapon Training Branch of the College.

The arrangement, whereby the schools were situated a distance from each other, proved to be impractical. As a result, the various training establishments in the Bloemfontein area were transferred to Tempe on 1 January 1914 and placed under the command of Lieutenant-Colonel P. C. B. Skinner. It was composed of:

- a School of General Military Instruction,
- a School of Musketry,
- a School of Signalling and
- a Medical Training School.

=== First World War ===
Following the outbreak of the First World War, the establishment at Tempe was closed and the staff transferred to the mobilisation camp at Potchefstroom early in 1915. During the war years, they were employed in training specialists and volunteers for service with the overseas contingents.

=== Interwar Years ===
In 1920, the College was re-established in the now familiar stone building at Roberts Heights (now Thaba Tshwane) and designated the South African Military School. Colonel W. E. C. Tanner, CB, CMG, DSO, was the Commandant.

On re-establishment, the School consisted of the "G' Branch, the Musketry Branch, the Signals Branch and a Training Depot. After March 1920, the real development of the College took place. By June of that year, military training was in full swing.

In 1923, a significant step was taken when 12 cadets commenced a course for commissions in the South African Permanent Force. As a result, college status could not be withheld from the Military School and, on 1 July 1924, it became the South African Military College. A second course for Permanent Force cadets began on 6 August 1924. Another course for Army cadets of the Permanent Force commenced in 1929. This course was amalgamated with an Air Force cadet course early in 1930, after it had been decided that cadets would in future receive combined training for service in the Infantry, Artillery and the Air Force. This training system continued until the outbreak of the Second World War in 1939.

This policy of combined training resulted in the appearance among South African officers of individuals who sported both spurs (horse gunners) and wings. In 1923, the Imperial Government provided well-qualified instructors for a series of courses in Physical and Recreational Training. These efforts did not meet with success and physical training was relegated to the background. In 1936 and 1937, a deputation was sent to Europe to investigate the matter. As a result, the Physical Training Branch was established on 1 May 1938.

=== Second World War ===
War broke out on 3 September 1939, giving the College its first experience of training soldiers under conditions of conflict. From June 1939 to June 1940, 9 170 students passed through the College, while at the peak period (in March 1942) there were 1 800 students of all ranks on courses. During the war, about 150 000 men of all ranks passed through the College.

The Commando Training Branch was transferred in 1940 and the Armour Branch shortly afterwards. In 1940, the Signals Branch moved from the College to Potchefstroom, where it became the Signals Training Centre, this name being changed to the School of Signals in 1944. The School of Signals again became a branch of the College in 1946 and, in January 1947, it was once more moved to Potchefstroom where it became a branch of the School of Artillery and Armour. The Chemical Warfare and the Concealment and Camouflage Branches were disbanded in 1945. In April 1945, the Regimental Training Branch became incorporated with the Weapon Training Branch.

=== Post War Years ===
The Administration and Ordnance Branch was established on 19 July 1950. In the same year, the Defence Force Academy Branch was established. In collaboration with the University of Pretoria, this branch undertook academic training of both Army and Air Force cadets. The joint training of Army and Air Force cadets at the College was terminated on the establishment of the Air Force College on 7 December 1951.

In the second half of 1953, provision was made for the Weapon Training Branch to be renamed the Infantry School. This school remained an integral part of the College and its first establishment table was set in January 1954.

On 31 May 1956, the Minister of Justice, Mr. C. R. Swart, presented the College with its Regimental Colour. About 400 men, representing 78 Citizen Force units, took part in the parade which accompanied the presentation ceremony. Major-General H. B. Klopper, DSO, Inspector General, and Brigadier P. H. Grobbelaar, uso, Army Chief-of-Staff, were on the saluting base with the Minister of Justice. The Trooping was done by four guards of 66 men each, with the Army Band providing the music. The Colour Ensign was Lieutenant C. J. Lloyd. Padré John A. Gurney, consecrated the Colour which was then lodged in the officers' mess at the College. Since the College has no battle honours, none appears on the Colour. The tassel and fringe are of gold braiding. The background is the same as that of the national flag - orange, white and blue bands of equal width. The College badge, a wildebeest, is embroidered on a blue background on the white hand of the Colour and is encircled by two laurels of pink proteas with green leaves. The motto "Paratus" is embroidered in gold on a scroll of old gold below the unit badge.

On 1 March 1968, the Chief of the Army, Lieutenant-General W. P. Louw, SM, announced that it had been decided to change the name of the South African Military College to the South African Army College. At the same time, the title of Commandant of the Military College was abolished and the title of Officer Commanding, South African Army College, introduced.

== Structure ==
The Training Formation consists of the following units:

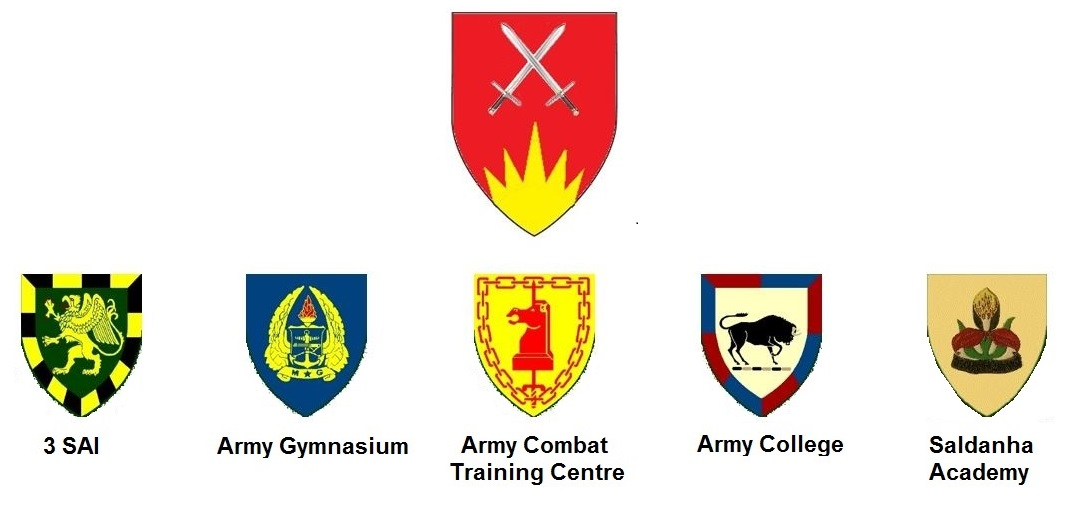

- 3 SAI Training Depot - basic soldiering skills to all recruits
- SA Army Combat Training Centre - the Army practical training ground
- South African Army Gymnasium - leader training
- South African Army College - command and management training for senior leaders

== Basic military training ==
South African Army recruits undergo 22 weeks of basic military training (BMT), up from 14 weeks in 2005. BMT is the first of a series of training periods undertaken at the SA Army Training Depot in Kimberley.

The BMT programme consists of 600 40-minute instructional periods, allocated to Fitness, Drill, Combat skills, Musketry, Shooting Exercises, Fieldcraft, Map Reading, Command Information, Political Science, SANDF & SA Army organisation, "Know your Enemy", Military Security, Chaplain's periods, Regimental duties, Standing Orders, Loss control, Guards and sentries, Military law, Hygiene, Buddy Aid, Conditioning training, Combat PT, Recreational PT, Parade drill, Compliments and saluting, Musketry and Weapons drill, Field exercises and route marches, as well as Basic mine awareness.

=== Fieldcraft ===
Field craft includes an emphasis on navigation (including maintaining direction in the bush) and map reading. Also focussed on is the use of a compass, orientating by using the sun and stars; camouflage and concealment – both of the individual and of fighting positions and bivouacs; stalking; observation and judging distance: all of this by day and night. The "bush lane" simulates conditions in the African Bushveld. A recruit is expected to walk up a specially laid-out path and identify and engage a variety of targets concealed along the way – using lessons drawn from fieldcraft. Instructors may also add tripwires, etc. to add to the realism and exercise knowledge acquired during the mine awareness lessons.

=== Musketry ===
Musketry training includes work on the shooting range and along the "bush lane", but is preceded by many hours mastering the maintenance and cleaning of the R4 service rifle. By the end of basic training, a recruit is expected to be able to shoot a 200mm group at 100m in prone and kneeling positions and, in the standing position, from 50m.

=== Fitness ===
Fitness is a basic requirement for soldiering, in addition to conditioning training and combat PT, usually conducted in uniform and boots, with an R4; recruits are also exposed to ever-longer route marches. By the end of basic training, the recruit should be able to complete a 25 km route march, bearing a rifle and 25 kg pack, in four-and-a-half hours. They will also be able to do 50 push-ups in two minutes, 60 sit-ups and 10 pull-ups, sequentially, within the same time-frame. After this they should be able to run 2.4 km, with rifle and battle jacket within 12 minutes.

=== Buddy Aid ===
Buddy aid concentrates on teaching each recruit the skills needed to render immediate first aid to a wounded or injured comrade. Problems covered include identifying and dealing with cardiac arrest, impeded breathing, snakebite, bleeding, burns, heat exhaustion, fractures and open wounds

== Formation Specific Training ==
Each type Formation receives its recruits after BMT and starts to train these individuals in specialized training relative to that Formation e.g.:

- School of Signals
- School of Armour
- School of Artillery
- School of Air Defence
- Infantry School
- Special Forces School
- School of Logistics Support
- Intelligence School

=== Example: Infantry Formation Training ===
For the Infantry Formation, this normally means at the Infantry School, where training commences with two weeks familiarisation training on the weapons found in a rifle platoon other than the R4. This includes training on pyrotechnics and flares, shrapnel mines, hand and rifle grenades, the 60mm patrol mortar, the RPG7 recoilless rocket launcher, the general purpose machine gun (FN MAG or Denel SS77) and the multiple 40 mm grenade launcher. This phase may also include familiarisation with night vision equipment. Once mastered, a rifleman is next schooled on conventional operations, with an emphasis on section battle drills and trench routine. This entails spending many a night digging and occupying trench lines and posting sentries. Full defensive fire plans, including all platoon weapons, will also be executed. A rifleman is introduced to the art of patrolling and laying ambushes – skills equally useful on the conventional battlefield as during counterinsurgency campaigns and for peace support. Also practiced are vehicle movement, countermine and defile drills and procedures for occupying covert temporary bases.

== Section Leader Training ==
Concurrent with specialised training, those willing, and fitting the profile, are selected and trained as section leaders. Those passing the six-week course are appointed lance corporals. Most will be promoted to substantive corporals after a successful trial period.

== Leadership Training ==
Leadership training is presented at the SA Army Gymnasium at Heidelberg, advanced leader training at the corps schools as well as at the SA Army College at Thaba Tshwane. Senior Army leaders receive training at the War and Defence Colleges.

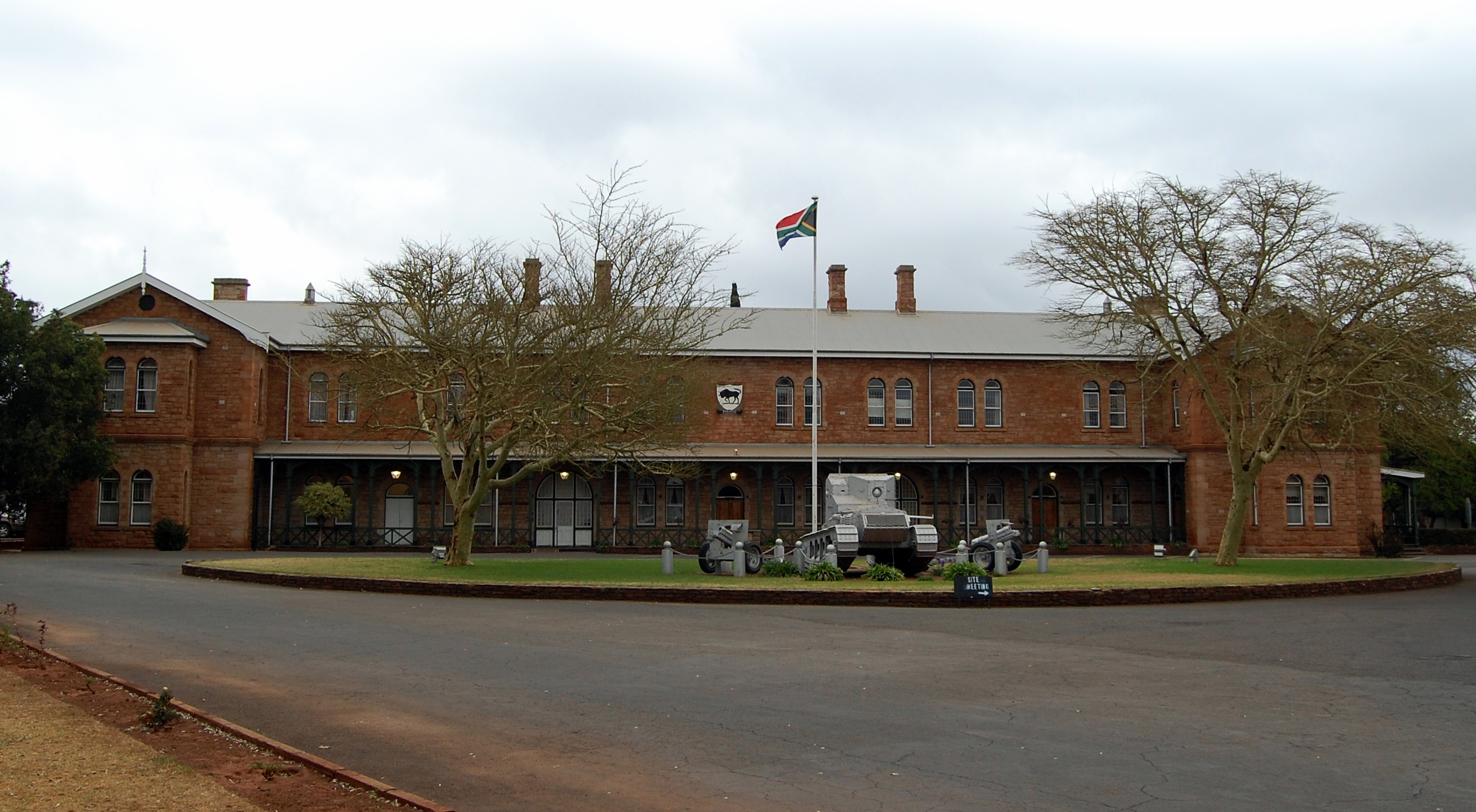

=== Joint Senior Command and Staff Programme ===
JSCSP is a 44 – week residential programme, held at the South Africa National War College, is aimed at preparing selected officers for senior appointments at the operational level of war by developing their command, staff, and analytical skills through broadening their professional understanding of joint and multinational operations, defence management and the wider aspects of the conflict.

o9lil

=== Military Research ===
The Military Academy at Saldanha Bay is the academic training centre for the three arms of the National Defence Force.

== Joint Warfare Training ==
Conventional combined Formation force training is conducted at the SA Army Combat Training Centre at Lohatlha in the Northern Cape and airborne force training at De Brug near Bloemfontein.

== Joint Services Training ==
All Services, Army, Air Force, Navy and Medical Services eventually combine in Joint Training exercises.
