= OR Tambo Regiment =

South African Army infantry regiment

Regiment Oos-Rand OR Tambo Regiment
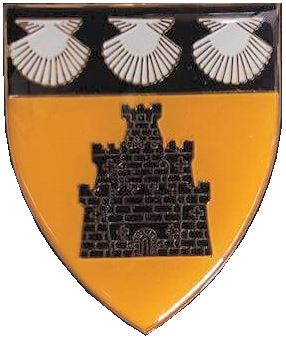
- SANDF Regiment Oos-Rand emblem
- Active: 1 January 1960 to present
- Country: South Africa
- Branch: South African Army
- Type: Internal Stability
- Part of: South African Infantry Formation
- Garrison/HQ: Benoni, Germiston
- Motto: Wees Sterk (Be Strong)

Insignia
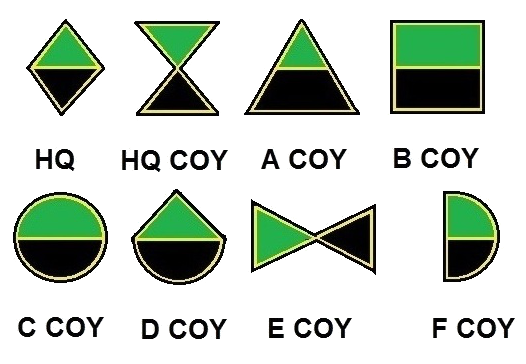
- Company level Insignia

- SA Motorised Infantry beret bar circa 1992
- Abbreviation: ORTR

The OR Tambo Regiment (formerly Regiment Oos-Rand) is a reserve infantry regiment of the South African Army.

== History ==
=== Origin ===
1. Regiment Oos- (East) Rand is an Armoured Infantry Regiment formed in 1960 during what became known as Stage 2 of the Reorganization of the South Africa Army. The April 1960 Government Gazette declared that Regiment Oos-Rand was activated on 1 January 1960 as a Citizen Force Unit.

2. At that time on the East Rand there existed the following Units:

a. 7 Medium (3TS) Artillery Regiment, and

b. 2 Light Anti-Aircraft Regiment, at Benoni "Drilsaal" (Marching Hall)

c. Regiment Kemp, an Armoured Regiment, at Springs.

d. Regiment Andries Pretorius, a Motorised Infantry Battalion, at Germiston

e. Witwatersrand Rifles, a Motorised Infantry Battalion, whose members were indeed allotted from the East Rand area, was headquartered in Johannesburg, and who, for the aforesaid reason, was perhaps less well known to the East Rand.

3. Of the existing units, the first four were disbanded, and in their place Regiment Oos Rand was formed with HQ in the "Drilsasl", Benoni, and whose membership numbered from mainly the officers and members of Regiment Kemp and Regiment Andries Pretorius, with a number of senior NCO's, including the Regimental Sergeant Major, of 7 Medium Regiment.

4. Commandant C.F.J. Meyer was appointed the Commanding Officer of the newly formed Regiment Oos Rand, with Warrant Officer 1 C.A. Laker JCD, as the Regimental Sergeant Major, and Colonel C.C. Schabort the Honorary Colonel.

=== Under the SADF ===
Just one week after it was activated, the regiment was mobilised for Operation Duiker and within 24 hours, 240 members were available. The regiments first Honorary Colonel was Senator C.C. Schabort on 9 August 1960. From 1976 to 1979, Regiment Oos-Rand called up members for active service in the border war.

By September the unit received it regimental emblem. During 1962 the regiment was re-organised as a motorised infantry battalion and on 14 September 1963 it received its Colours.

==== Freedom of Benoni ====
The regiment received the Freedom of Benoni in 1967.

The regiment received its ceremonial sword on 18 October 1969.

==== Operations ====
From 1983 onward, Regiment Oos-Rand was involved in internal stability and township control.

==== Motorized to Mechanised ====
In 1990 the regiment was converted to a mechanised infantry battalion and participated in excersize "sweepslag" at the Army Battle School located at the Lohatla. Lohatla is a training area of the South African National Defence Force. It is located in the Northern Cape province of South Africa and is home to the SA Army Combat Training Centre

==== Mechanized to Light Infantry ====
By 1995, the unit strength declined much due to the elimination of conscript national service. The newly formed South African National Defense force announced another reorganization, Regiment Oos Rand was transformed into a Light Infantry unit, Regiment Springs was disbanded and amalgamated into Regiment Oos Rand. By the end of 1996 the reaction unit was formed, and a major recruitment effort was led to rebuild the unit strength.

==== Divisional Command ====
Regiment Oos-Rand was assigned to the command of 73 Brigade in this era.

=== Under the SANDF ===
Today Regiment Oos-Rand, is a typical reserve light infantry battalion.

==== Deployments ====
Regiment Oos-Rand is also involved with Operation Corona, a continuous anti poaching operation in the Kruger National Park.

==== Name change ====
In August 2019, 52 Reserve Force units had their names changed to reflect the diverse military history of South Africa. Regiment Oos Rand became the OR Tambo Regiment, and have 3 years to design and implement new regimental insignia.

The regiment's new title is in honor of Oliver Tambo, who for many years served as the President of the African National Congress and was co-founder of uMkhonto we Sizwe.

== Leadership ==
Leadership
From	Honorary Colonel	To	Ribbon
	No known incumbents		
From	Officer Commanding	To	Ribbon
1960	Cmdt C.F.J. Meyer	c. nd	
1970	Cmdt John Lubbe	c. nd	
1989	Cmdt W.N. "Butch" Louw	c. nd	
1990	Cmdt J.H. "Total" de Beer	c. nd	
1991	LtCol H "Batman" La Grange	c. nd	
From	Regimental Sergeants Major	To	Ribbon
1960	WO1 C.A. Laker, JCD	c. nd	
1968	WO1 Venter	c. nd	
1977	WO1 Wolmerans	c. nd	
1978	WO1 Koertzen	c. nd	
1981	WO1 Des Thorpe	c. nd	
1990	WO1 Anton "Mamba" Landman	c. nd	
1995	WO1 Richard Clark	c. nd	
2004	WO1 Stuart Ceronie	c. nd	

== Regimental Symbols ==
=== Previous Dress Insignia ===
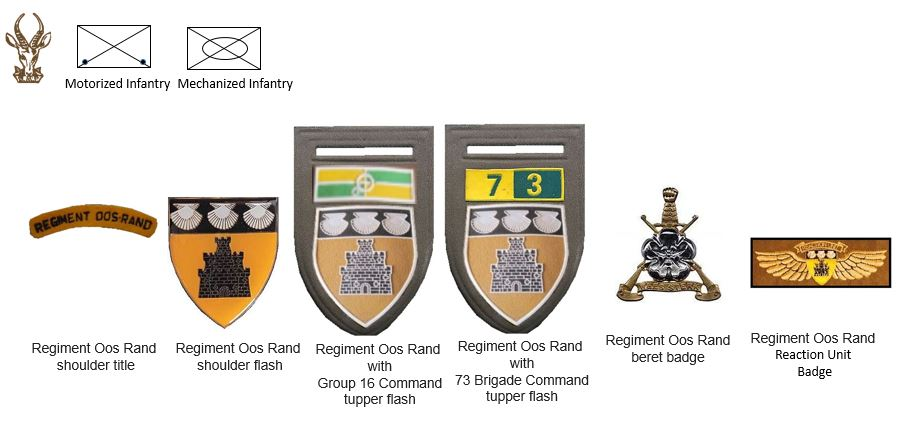
SADF era Regiment Oos Rand insignia

=== Current Dress Insignia ===
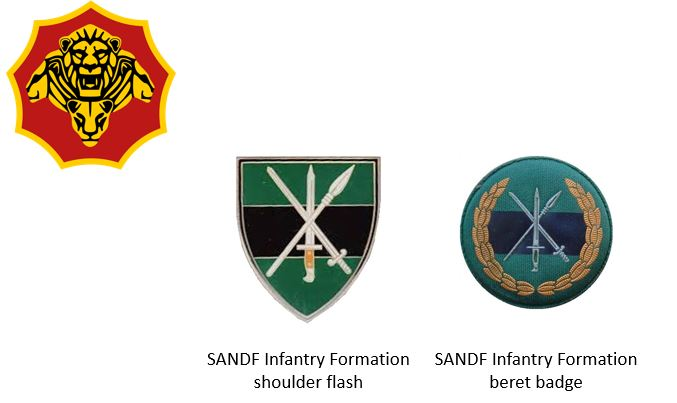
SANDF era Infantry Formation insignia

== Training ==
Regiment East Rand specialised in 81 mm Mortar platoons, Medics, Signals and Drivers
