= 12 South African Infantry Battalion =

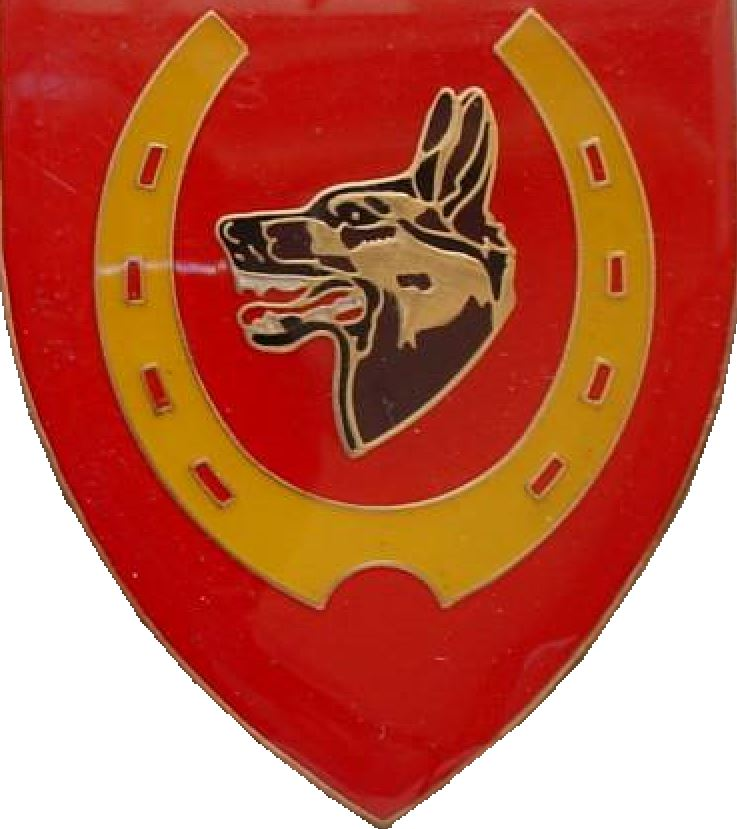
- 12 SAI emblem
- Active: 1964-2005
- Country: South Africa
- Branch: South African Army
- Type: Horse and dog assisted infantry
- Garrison/HQ: Potchefstroom
- Engagements: South African Border War

12 South African Infantry Battalion was a horse, dog and motorbike assisted infantry unit of the South African Army, which provided horse-mounted infantry and dog handlers to the army for defence purposes.

== History ==
=== Origin ===
The SADF established a dog and equestrian centre at Voortrekkerhoogte in 1964.

=== Equestrian Centre History ===
By 1974, the Equestrian Centre was moved to the farm Welgegund near Potchefstroom.

A stud farm grew out of the equestrian centre in 1980. Budget cuts starting in 1989 eventually let to the closure of the De Aar facility in 1991.

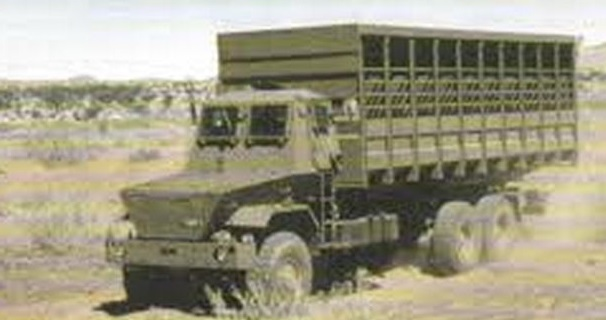
SADF Kwevoel 100 horse carrier

The unit's equestrian capability was transferred to the police on April 14, 2005.

==== Equestrian Centre Insignia ====
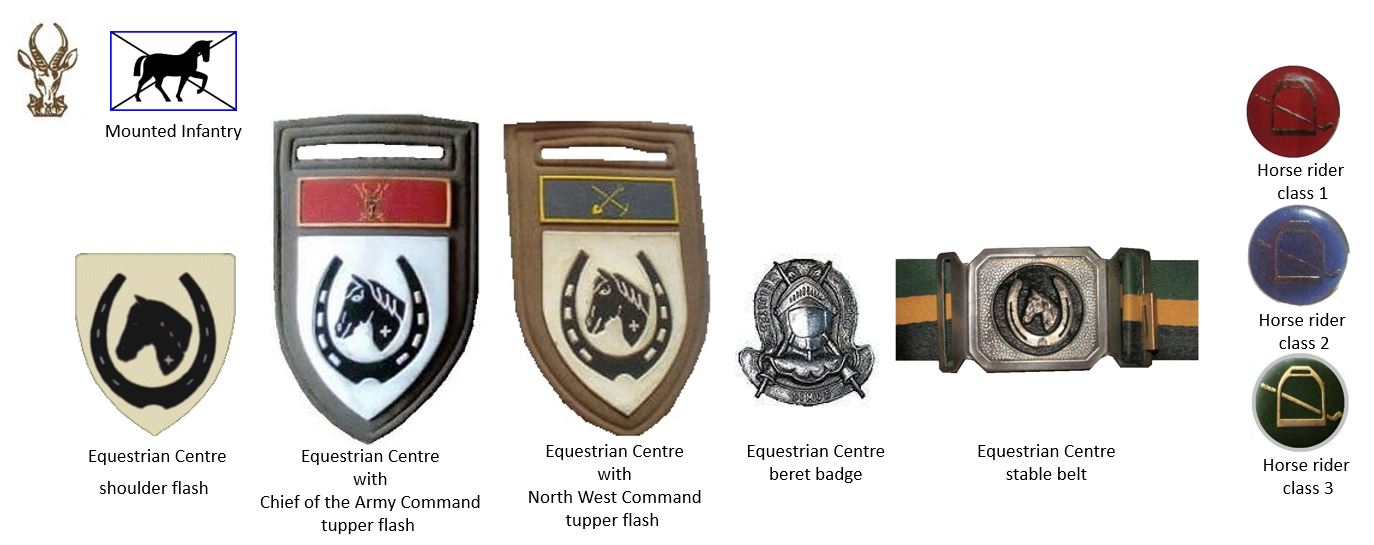
SADF era Equestrian Centre insignia

=== Dog Centre History ===
The main function of the Dog Training School at Voortrekkerhoogte, was to train dogs and their handlers in mine detection reconnaissance, tactical and security work. The unit was also responsible for acquiring suitable dogs and researching dog diseases, nutrition and breeding In the main, German Shepherds, Rottweilers, Doberman Pinschers, Labrador Retrievers, and Border Collies were trained. This training started when the dogs were almost two years old and lasted from one to two years.

The dog centre was moved to Bourke's Luck, in Mpumalanga, in 1979.

==== Dog Centre Insignia ====
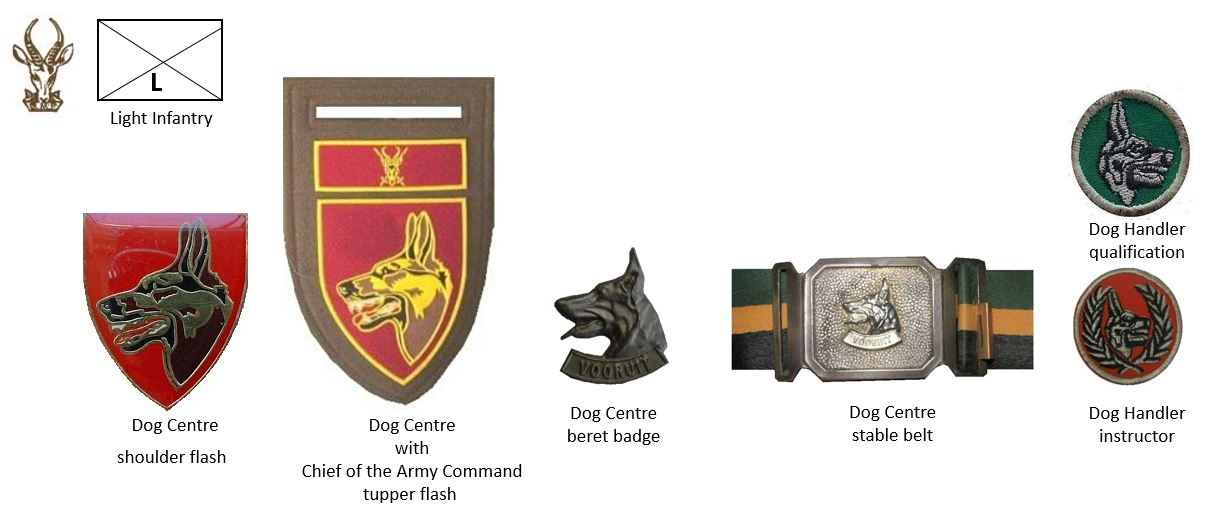
SADF era Dog Centre insignia

=== Amalgamation into 12 SAI ===
By 1993 the Equestrian and Dog Centres were amalgamated into 12 SAI.

Commanding Officer and RSM

Col. Britz and RSM Schoeman were the first OC and RSM.

==== 12 SAI insignia ====
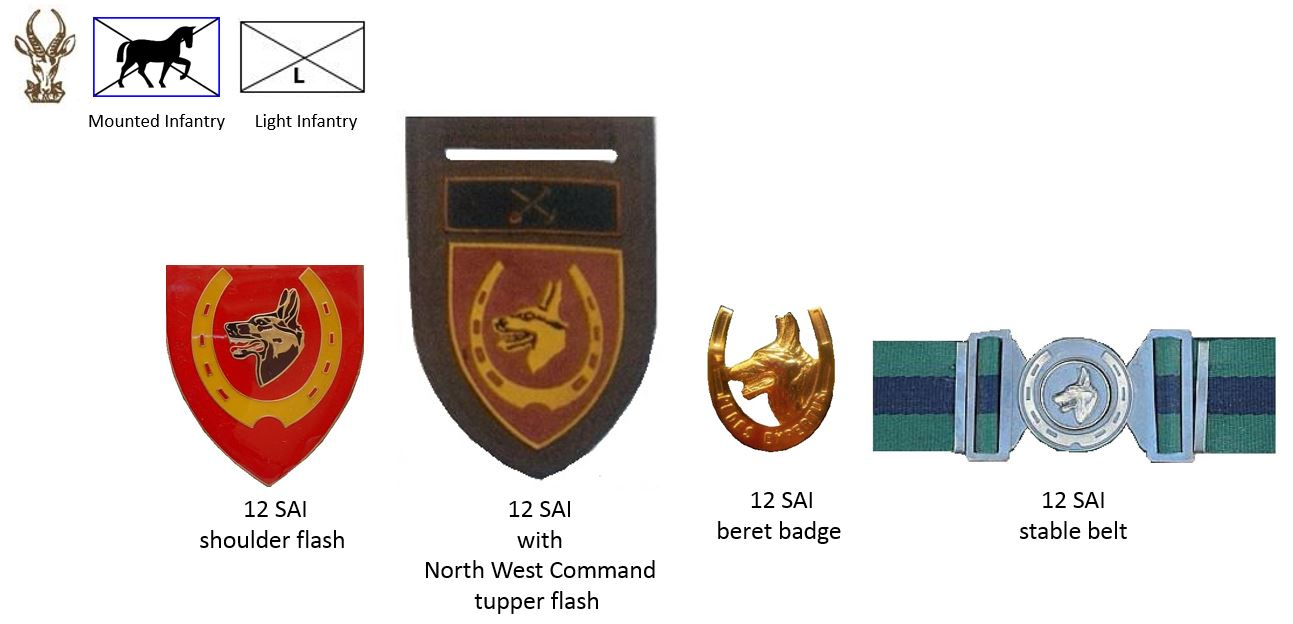
SADF era 12 SAI insignia

=== Disbandment ===
By 2005, 12 SAI's dogs and related infrastructure was finally transferred to the South African Military Health Service, Military Veterinary Institute, while the units motorcycle and visual tracking capabilities were transferred to the Infantry School near Oudtshoorn.

The equestrian capability of 12 SAI was handed over to the SAPS formally through a parade on 14 April 2005.

== Notes ==
Scientia Militaria vol 40, no 3, 2012, pp. 398–428. doi: 10.5787/40-3-1028 The South African Defence Force and Horse Mounted Infantry Operations, 1974-1985 Jacques J.P. de Vries, Sandra Swart
