= Lenong Regiment =

Regiment President Kruger Regiment Wes Rand Regiment President Kruger Lenong Regiment
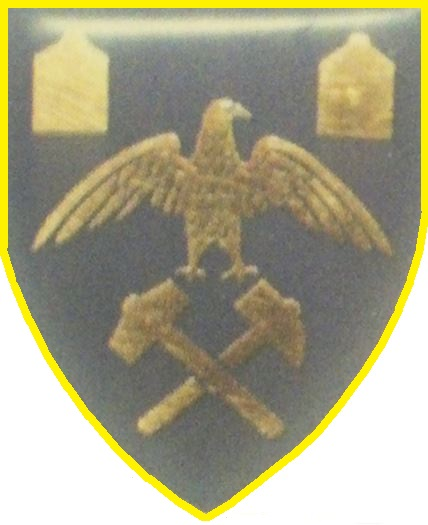
- SANDF Regiment President Kruger emblem
- Active: 1954–present
- Country: South Africa
- Allegiance: Republic of South Africa; Republic of South Africa
- Branch: South African Army; South African Army
- Type: Infantry
- Role: Motorised Infantry/Internal Stability
- Size: One battalion
- Part of: South African Infantry Formation; Army Conventional Reserve
- Garrison/HQ: Randfontein, Gauteng, South Africa
- Motto: Ons sal oorwin (We shall overcome)

Insignia
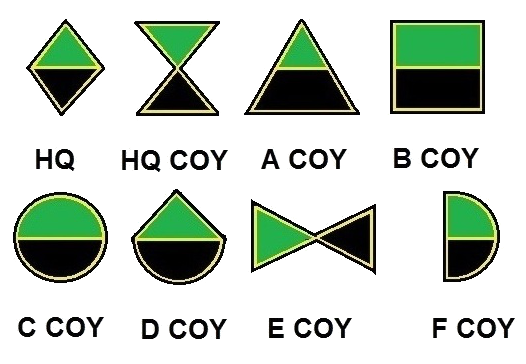
- Company level Insignia

- SA Motorised Infantry beret bar circa 1992: SA Motorised Infantry beret bar
- Abbreviation: LR

The Lenong Regiment (formerly Regiment President Kruger) is a reserve motorised infantry regiment of the South African Army.

== History ==
Regiment President Kruger was raised in 1954 as a motorised infantry unit and was initially headquartered in Krugersdorp.

=== Name change ===
By 1960 the unit was renamed to Regiment Wes Rand. This was however reverted by 1964.

In August 2019, 52 Reserve Force units had their names changed to reflect the diverse military history of South Africa. Regiment President Kruger became the Lenong Regiment, and have 3 years to design and implement new regimental insignia.

=== Garrison ===
The unit's HQ moved to Randfontein around 1972, about 20 kilometers away.

== Freedom of Entry ==
The unit exercised its freedom of entry into Johannesburg on 9 November 2013 as part of the centenary celebrations of the City of Johannesburg with bayonets fixed, colours flying, and drums beating.

== Regimental colours ==
The units eagle symbol depicted the old Transvaal Republican era.

=== Previous dress insignia ===
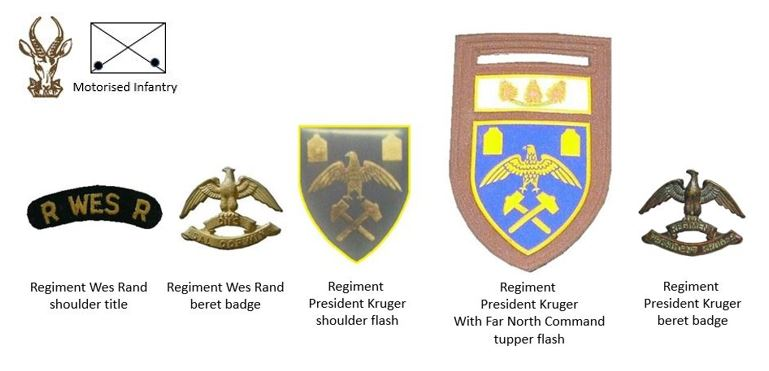
SADF era Regiment President Kruger

=== Current dress insignia ===
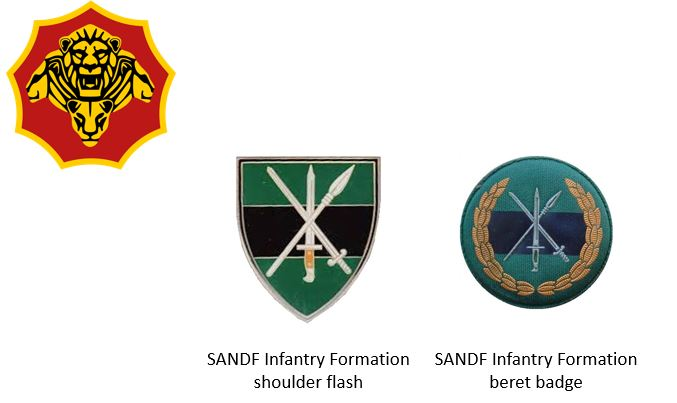
SANDF era Infantry Formation insignia

== Deployments and training ==
The regiment has been deployed as part of the SANDF (South African National Defence Force) throughout Africa, Burundi, DRC; in support of United Nations and African Union peacekeeping mandates. All members of the Regiment are volunteers, with employment in the civilian roles, they fulfil their responsibilities and duties on top of their duties and responsibilities to their families and employers.

== Leadership ==
Leadership
| From | Honorary Colonel | To | Ribbon |
|---|---|---|---|
| | No known incumbents | | |
| From | Officer Commanding | To | Ribbon |
| | No known incumbents | | |
| From | Regimental Sergeants Major | To | Ribbon |
| | No known incumbents | | |

=== Honorary Colonel ===
- Colonel Jacques Jean-Marie Julienne (2012)
