= 3 South African Infantry Battalion =

3 South African Infantry Battalion (3 SAI)
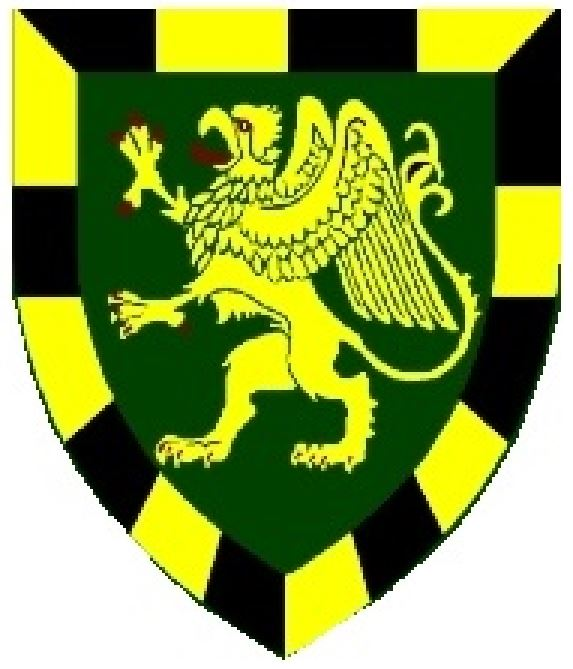
- 3 SAI emblem
- Active: 1 January 1962 - onwards
- Country: South Africa
- Branch: South African Army
- Type: Basic training
- Size: Battalion
- Part of: South African Army Training Formation
- Garrison/HQ: Potchefstroom
- Motto: Pervincamus
- Engagements: South African Border War Operation Savannah

3 South African Infantry Battalion is the Basic training unit of the South African Army.

== History ==
On 28 November 1961, SADFO 181/61 Inception and Allocation of units of the Permanent Force, was issued by Commandant-General P.H. Grobbelaar. This SADFO contained the name of 3 SA Infantry Battalion, leading to the unit's inception on 1 January 1962. On 17 January 1962 the newly appointed Officer Commanding, commandant J.J. Wahl, and personnel gathered at Auckland Park where the purpose, training and other commitments of the unit were explained.

3 SAI's first headquarters was established at Lenz by March of that year.

=== Relocation to Potchefstroom ===
3 SA Infantry Battalion moved to Potchefstroom on 5 December 1968 with Commandant B.A. Ferreira as the new Commanding Officer. 3 SAI was given operational status, an additional responsibility. Two infantry Battalions were organised under the command of one Commanding Officer. During 1970, 3 SA Infantry Battalion was transformed into a force-in-being. National service intakes now took place biannually, in January and July. This resulted in very large intakes. From January 1969 to January 1971 over 3,000 national servicemen passed through the unit. The role of the unit changed temporarily from the training of national servicemen to training Citizen Force members in 1987.

=== Migration to Kimberly ===
In January 1988 the Commanding Officer North-West Command announced that 3 SA Infantry Battalion was going to move yet again, this time to Kimberley. This move took place by convoy on 5 December 1988. It was to become a voluntary service unit with colonel J.M.R. van der Riet as Commanding Officer from 16 December 1988. On 17 September 1990 the unit moved to its present location at Midlands base, Kimberley.

By March 1987 the Chief of the Army instructed that companies of the State President's unit complete the last six months of their training at 3 SA Infantry Training Unit, to be deployed in operations. National Service intakes ceased when the unit moved to Kimberley on 5 December 1988.

The units’ main responsibilities now were training and operational. In 1989 the unit was settled at Diskobolos in Kimberley under the Northern Cape Command. The new source of manpower was volunteers with recruitment mainly from the Northern Cape, Orange Free State and Transvaal. The first voluntary intake arrived in January 1990.

=== Army Training Depot ===
During 1997 the unit changed to the training depot of the Army. The first female intake for Voluntary Military Service took place in January 1999. In January 2005 the unit had its biggest Military Skills Development System intake ever. About 2000 recruits were called up, but only 1937 arrived for Basic Military Training. The unit also presents formal training to Permanent Force members of the SA Army.

=== Colours ===
On 17 April 1971 3 SA Infantry Battalion received its colours from Commandant-General R.C. Hiemstra. 3 SA Infantry Battalion received the Freedom of the City of Potchefstroom on 27 May 1988. A parade was formed at the city hall where the scroll was received. A march-past followed through the streets of the town after which guests of honor and senior officers attended a luncheon at the city hall.

=== Freedom of Kimberley ===
The Freedom of the City was conferred upon 3 SAI Bn on 13 April 2005. 3 SAI Bn is the fourth military institution to be honoured with the Freedom of the City of Kimberley.

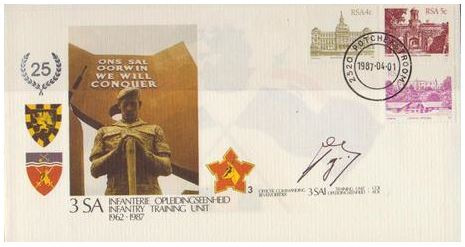
SADF 3 SAI Commemorative First Day Cover issued by the South African Post Office

== Leadership ==
Leadership
From	Honorary Colonel	To	Ribbon
	No known incumbents		
From	Officer Commanding	To	Ribbon
1962	Cmdt J.J. Wahl	c. 1963	
1963	Cmdt H.C. Schmidt	c. 1966	
1966	Cmdt M.T. le Roux	c. 1968	
1968	Cmdt J.J. Keyter	c. 1968	
1968	Cmdt B.A. Ferreira	c. 1973	
1974	Cmdt M.J. Viljoen	c. 1975	
1975	Cmdt J.G. du P. Coetzee	c. 1978	
1978	Cmdt J.H. Maritz	c. 1979	
1980	Cmdt P.S. Grobler	c. 1981	
1981	Cmdt A. Henrico	c. 1982	
1984	Col J. Coetzer	c. 1986	
1986	Col F. Burger	c. 1987	
1988	Col J.M.R. van der Riet	c. nd	
From	Regimental Sergeants Major	To	Ribbon
1962	WO1 J.P. Kriel	c. 1964	
1964	WO1 E.H. van den Berg	c. 1966	
1966	WO1 M.E. Louw	c. 1968	
1968	WO1 G.L. Nel	c. 1969	
1969	WO1 C.J.J. Potgieter	c. 1973	
1973	WO1 C. Haasbroek	c. 1976	
1976	WO1 H.P.C. Torlage	c. 1981	
1981	WO1 J.P. Ueckermann	c. 1982	
1982	WO1 D.J. Oosthuizen	c. 1988	

== Insignia ==
=== Previous Dress Insignia ===
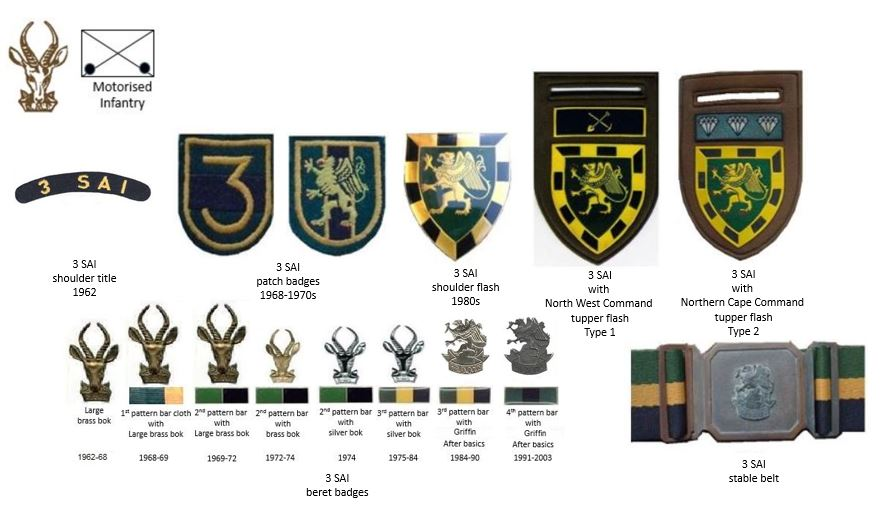
SADF era 3 SAI insignia

=== Current Dress Insignia ===
Standard Dress
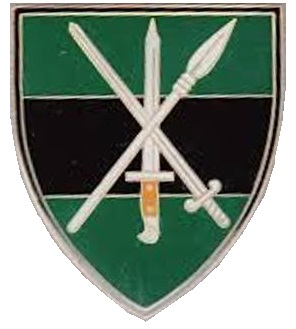
SANDF Infantry wide shoulder flash
