= Chief Albert Luthuli Regiment =

South African Army reserve infantry battalion

Regiment de Wet Chief Albert Luthuli Regiment
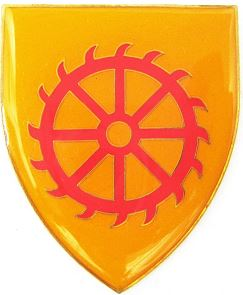
- Regiment de Wet emblem
- Country: South Africa
- Allegiance: Allied forces; South Africa
- Branch: South African Army
- Size: Battalion
- Part of: South African Infantry Corps; Army Conventional Reserve
- Garrison/HQ: Kroonstad
- Motto: "Trouheid hou die wag" (Loyalty will protect us)

Insignia
- Abbreviation: CALR

Chief Albert Luthuli Regiment (formerly Regiment De Wet) is a reserve infantry battalion of the South African Army.

== History ==
=== Origins ===
Regiment de Wet was one of six Afrikaans-speaking Citizen Force regiments established in 1934 as part of the expansion of the then Union Defence Force of South Africa.

The regiment was named after the Orange Free State Boer War commandant, Christiaan de Wet.

The regiment's headquarters was located in Kroonstad, a large town in the Orange Free State and a vital railway junction that gave some strategic importance, and recruits were enlisted from the entire Orange Free State province.

=== World War 2 ===
In June 1940, the regiment, volunteered 117 men, and was used to reinforce the ranks of Regiment President Steyn, and the later included men from the Louw Wepner and the Oranje-Vrystaatse Veldartillerie regiments, during World War II, the two former were infantry units at the time. It served in Egypt and Libya.

=== Reorganisation ===
In 1960 it was renamed Noord-Vrystaat, but resumed its original name on 1 September 1966. Regiment President Steyn was converted to an armored car regiment and in 1975 to a tank regiment but Regiment de Wet remained infantry.

=== Incorporation ===
Regiment de Wet was absorbed into Regiment Bloemspruit around April 1997.

=== Name change ===
After having been raised again; in August 2019, 52 Reserve Force units had their names changed to reflect the diverse military history of South Africa. Regiment De Wet became the Chief Albert Luthuli Regiment, and have 3 years to design and implement new regimental insignia.

=== Battle honours ===
The unit also served in numerous deployments in the Border War in SWA/Namibia

=== Freedom of the City ===
Freedom of Kroonstad

== Leadership ==
{Officer Commanding: Lt Col A. M Mosehlana from 10 November 2023 to Date RSM: MWO M. G. Mokgothotso from 01 January 2021 to date}

== Regimental emblems ==
=== Dress Insignia ===
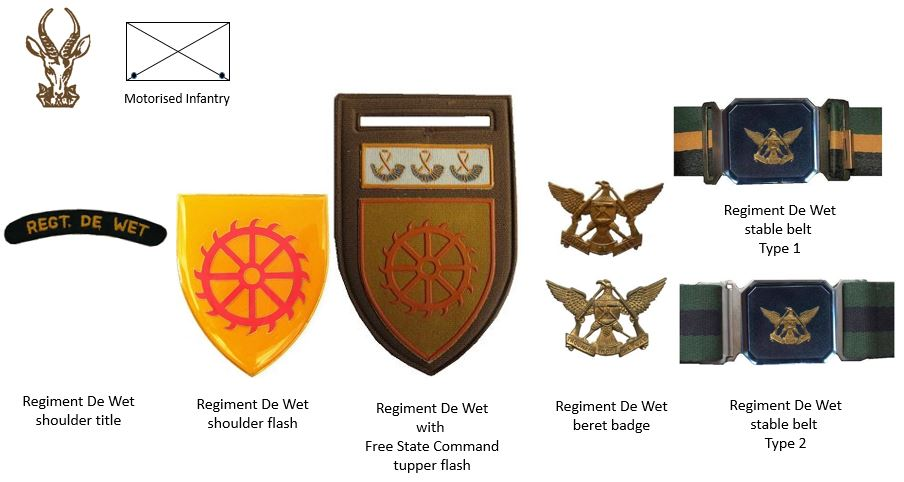
SADF era Regiment De Wet insignia
