= Honoris Crux =

Honoris Crux may refer to one of five South African military decorations. A set of four classes of Honoris Crux decorations—the Honoris Crux Diamond, Honoris Crux Gold, Honoris Crux Silver and Honoris Crux of 1975—together replaced the discontinued Honoris Crux of 1952.

- Honoris Crux (1952), in use from 1952 to 1975
- Honoris Crux (1975), in use from 1975 to 2003
- Honoris Crux Silver, in use from 1975 to 2003
- Honoris Crux Gold, in use from 1975 to 1992
- Honoris Crux Diamond, in use from 1975 to 2003 (though never awarded)
