= Military Skills Development System =

South African entry-level recruitment programme

The Military Skills Development System is the entry-level recruitment programme of the South African National Defence Force. It provides entry-level recruits to the South African Army, Air Force, Navy and Medical Service. It has been running since 2003.

== Programme ==
The programme is aimed at rejuvenating an aging defence force and ensuring the continuous flow of young and fit soldiers. The programme is also aimed at creating an increased state of military readiness, by enlarging the South African military reserves.

Recruits must first pass a psychometric test which consists of mathematics, word problems and non verbal reasoning. If a recruit fails the test they are ejected from the selection process. Once the test has been completed the recruits select a corps that they want to train in (example - infantry) .The remaining recruits will then go for a full body medical examination. Those who are declared medically fit will then proceed and be interviewed.

Recruits enlist for an initial two-year period, after which they will be considered for further service in the Permanent Force. Those who do not qualify will serve part-time in the reserve forces for a period of five years.

Outstanding recruits get selected and trained as leaders, either as non commissioned officer or candidate officers. If they complete the officers-formative training course candidate-officers are sent to the military academy in Saldanha for at least one year.
