= South African Army Infantry Formation =

- SANDF Infantry Formation badge
- Country: South Africa
- Branch: South African Army
- Type: Infantry
- Motto: Gladium Practamus (Wielders of the Sword)
- Colors: Green and black

Commanders
- Notable commanders: Lieutenant General Rudzani Maphwanya

Insignia
- Collar Badge: Springbok head
- Beret Colour: Green (motorised, mechanised, airborne, seaborne and light infantry); Maroon (parachute infantry)
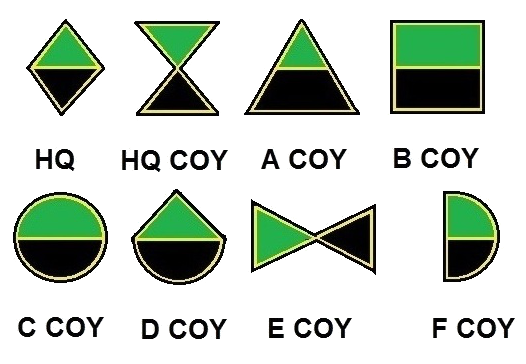
- Company level Insignia

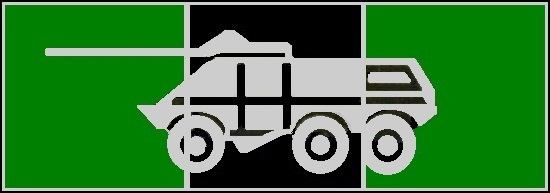
- SA Mechanised Infantry beret bar circa 1992

- SA Motorised Infantry beret bar circa 1992

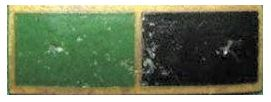
- SA Infantry beret bar circa 1980

The South African Army Infantry Formation supervises all infantry within the South African Army.

== History ==
=== Origins: Union Defence Force ===
South African Infantry originated as the Infantry Branch of the Union Defence Forces in 1913.

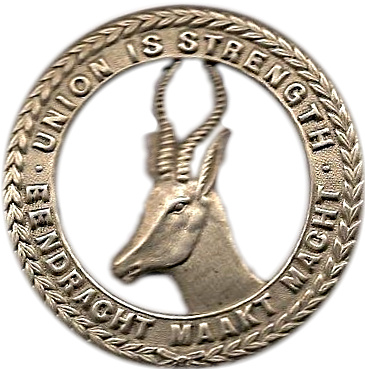
Old 1st SA Infantry Union Defence Force emblem

In 1915, the defence forces established the South African Overseas Expeditionary Force for war service outside Southern Africa. It included the South African Infantry, comprising twelve battalions, and the Cape Corps, comprising two battalions of Coloured volunteers. These units were disbanded in 1919.

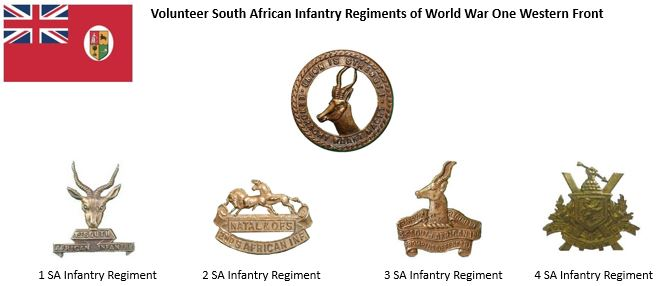
South African Volunteer Infantry Regiments on the Western Front circa World War One

The Infantry Branch was enlarged in 1934, and the mounted rifles regiments were converted to infantry in 1935.

In 1943, the Infantry Branch was incorporated into the new South African Armoured Corps, which was divided into armour and infantry branches after World War II.

=== Republic Defence Force (SADF) ===
==== Separated by language ====
Based on the findings of a committee led by Brigadier H.B. Popper in late 1953, it was recommended that some English-speaking units be converted to Afrikaans medium units, while other regiments should be amalgamated or contracted.

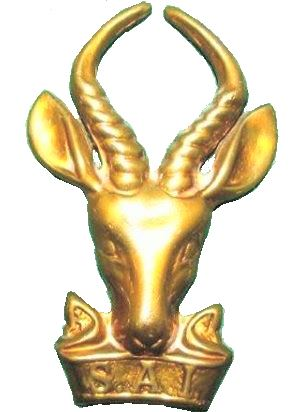
Old SADF Republic Defence Force Infantry Corps emblem ver 1

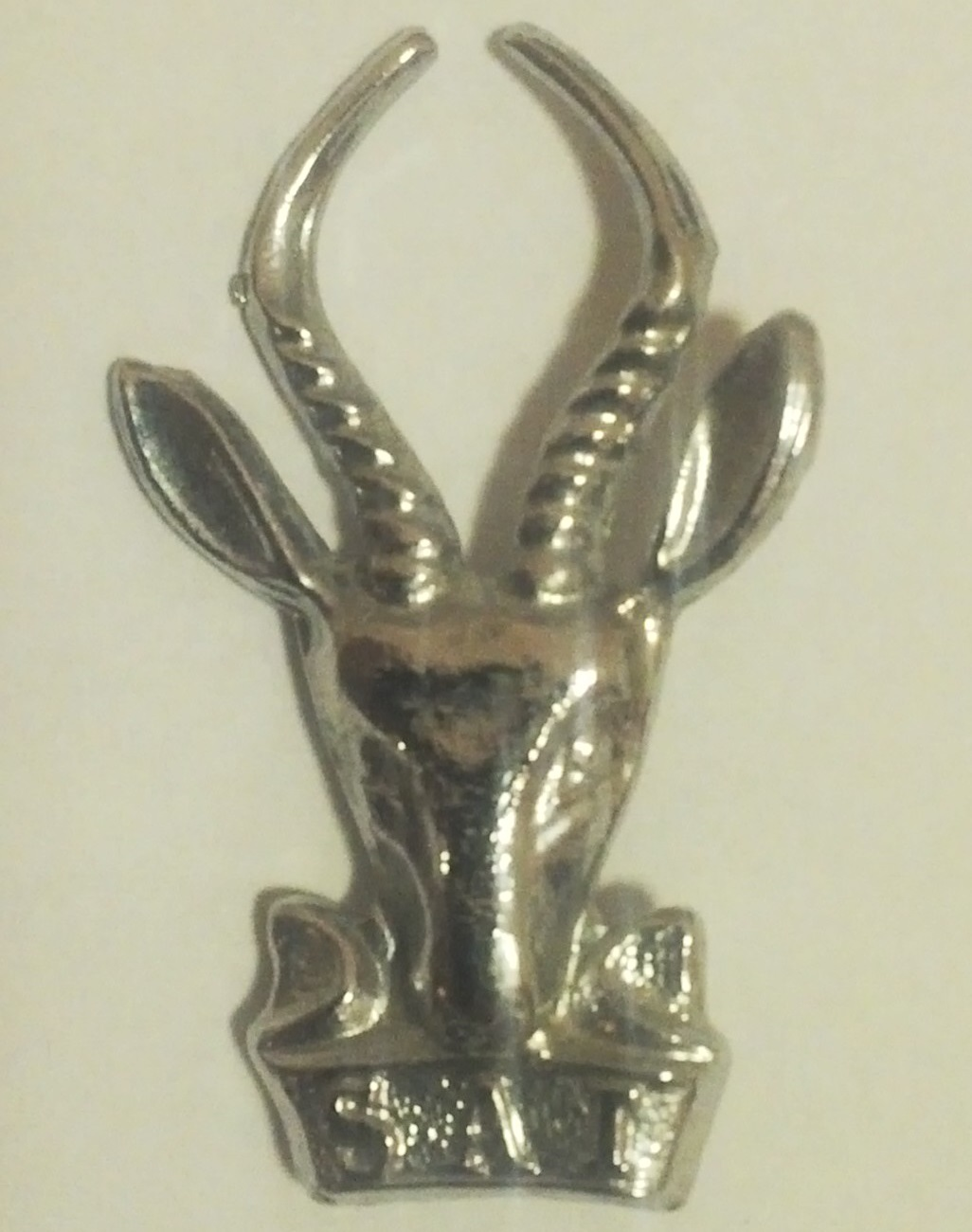
Old SADF Republic Defence Force Infantry Corps emblem ver 2

Despite representations made by some of the units affected, the reorganisation went ahead from January 1954. In 1956 a further reorganisation was made necessary by the considerable increase in the number of citizens balloted for training in some areas. The Army was accordingly reorganised to consist of 32 Afrikaner-speaking units (including five infantry regiments, five tank units, and four armoured car units) and 20 English medium units (including ten infantry regiments, four tank units, and one armoured car unit). The changes were implemented with effect from 22 September 1956.

In 1954, the SA-AC's Infantry Branch, and the personnel of the South African Instructional Corps, were formed into the South African Infantry Corps.

In 1972, continuous national service was increased to twelve months and by 1974, there were ten full-time motorised infantry battalions, besides the parachute battalion. The infantry reserve comprised 42 citizen force infantry battalions, a parachute regiment and over 200 commando internal defence units.

==== Separated by race (Black Infantry) ====
Plans were in place to establish volunteer black infantry units along ethnic lines, comparable to the Cape Corps.

The volunteer black infantry unit plans eventually bore fruit with the formation of 21, 111, 113, 115, 116 (Northern Sooth, Messina), 117, 118, 121 and 151 Battalions. Another battalion, 114 Battalion, was planned but not actually formed.

Many of their members were Service Volunteers, members of all the population groups who were not compelled to do National Service (hence excluding white males). Eventually, the various black battalions amounted to about 16,000 troops, and some of the members of these battalions became Auxiliary or Permanent Force members.

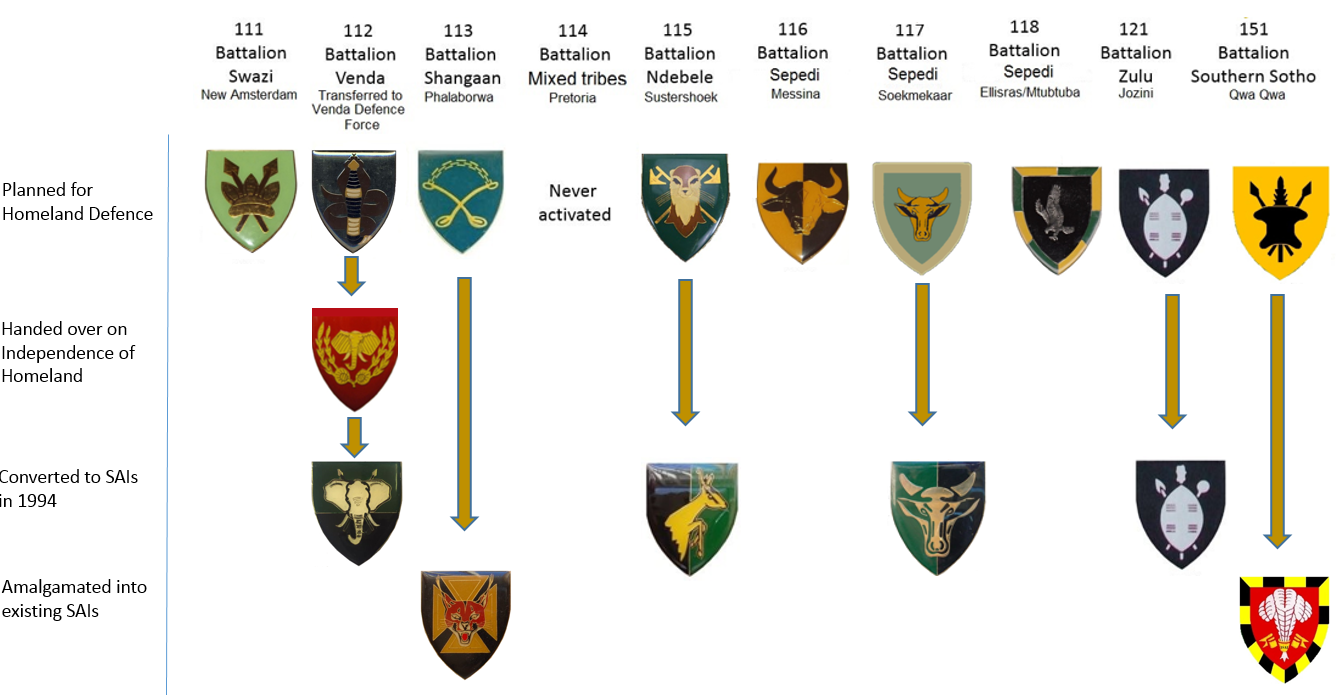
SADF era Black Infantry Battalions

=== National Defence Force (SANDF) post 1994 ===
Current SANDF National Defence Force Infantry Formation emblem

In the post-apartheid era, no ethnic or language-based infantry exists at all. By 1997, several units were reorganised:

- 13 SAI was amalgamated into 14 SAI at Umtata,
- 151 Battalion was amalgamated into 1 SAI
- 113 Battalion was amalgamated into 7 SAI
- 61 Mechanised Battalion Group was disbanded and elements incorporated into 8 SAI
- 16 SAI was disbanded 1997.

In the 1980s Regiment Port Natal appears to have been a component of 84 Motorised Brigade. It was amalgamated with the Durban Light Infantry about 1999.

=== From Corps to Formation ===
In 2000 the Corps became known as the South African Army Infantry Formation. The first female battalion commander appears to have been appointed in 2001. The specialised horse/motorcycle/dog-using battalion, 12 South African Infantry Battalion, was disbanded in April 2005. The previous General Officer Commanding up to 2012 was Lieutenant General Themba Nkabinde.

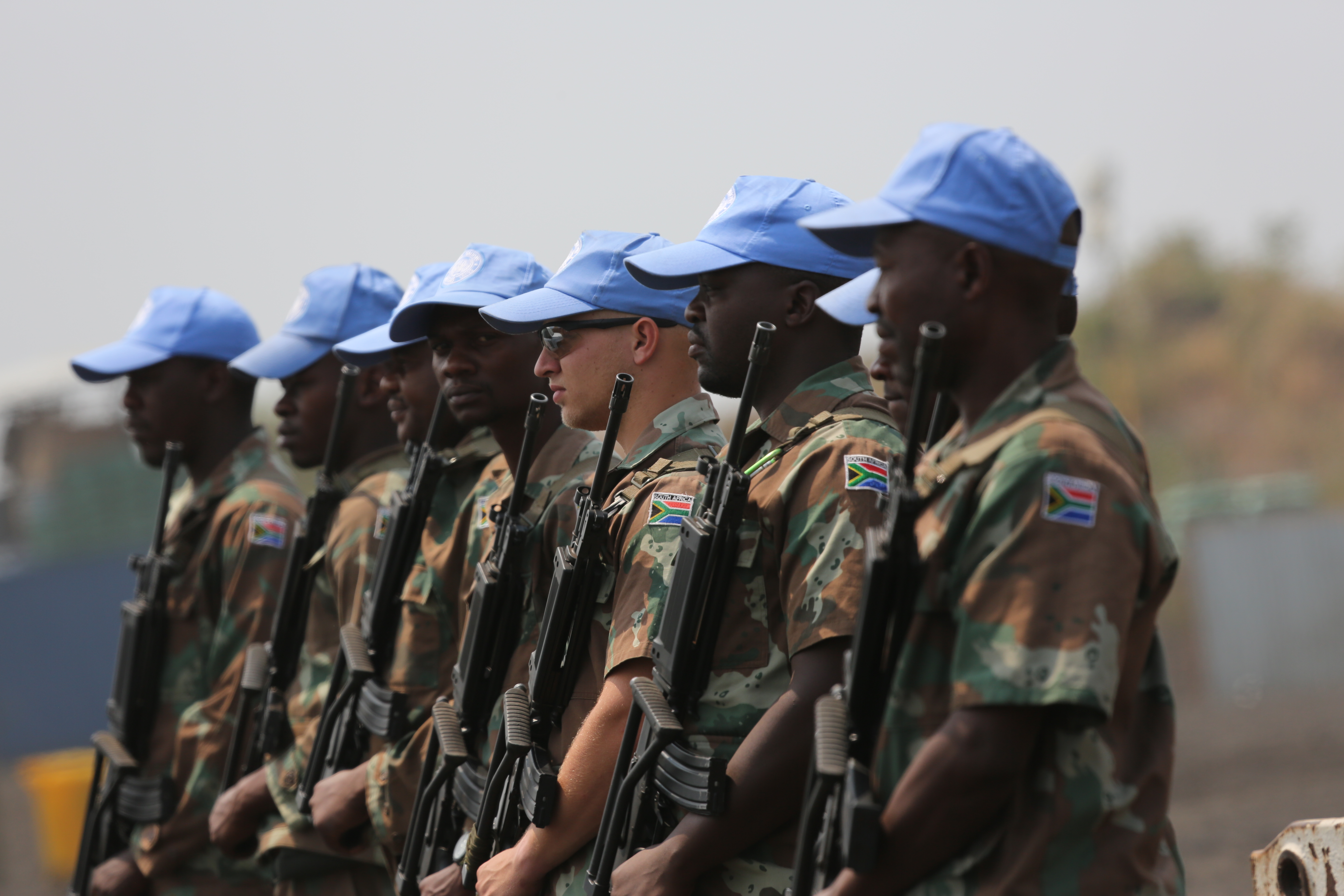
Guard of Honour at the Sake base of the SA Battalion of the Force Intervention Brigade (MONUSCO)

Since 1994, South Africa's Infantry units have supported numerous operations for the United Nations and the African Union across the continent, including in the Democratic Republic of the Congo (MONUC/MONUSCO), the Force Intervention Brigade in particular, Burundi (South African Protection Support Detachment, and African Union Mission in Burundi), in the Comores, and with AMIS/UNMIS in Sudan.

== Formation structure and units ==
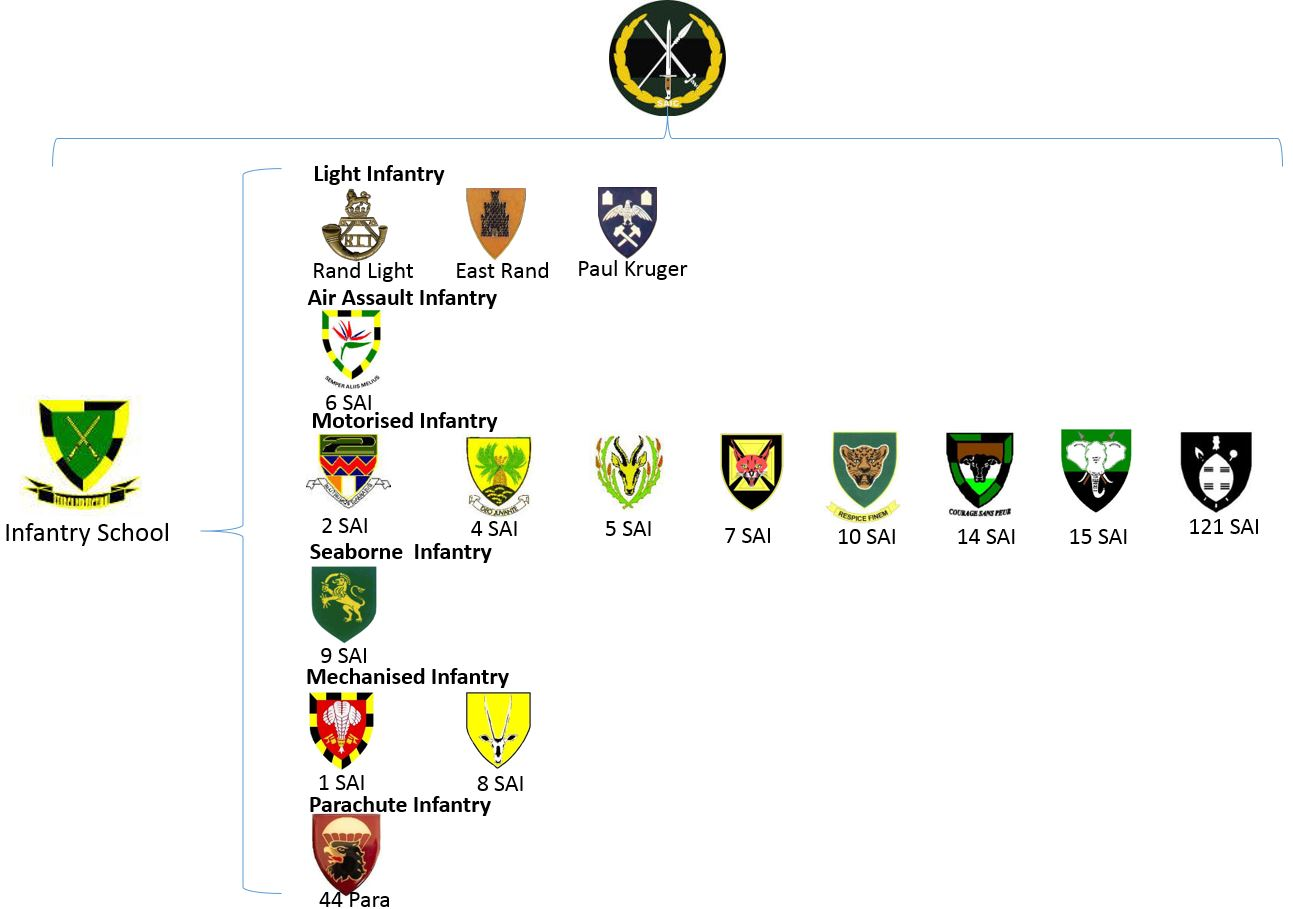

The infantry corps contains a total of 15 regular battalions in a variety of different roles:

- Mechanised Infantry – 2 battalions
- Motorised Infantry – 8 battalions
- Light Infantry – 1 battalion
- Parachute Infantry – 1 battalion
- Air Assault Infantry – 1 battalion
- Seaborne Infantry – 1 battalion
- Basic Training – 1 battalion
- The Oudtshoorn army base houses the South African Infantry School.

The infantry corps contains a total of 26 reserve battalions in the following roles:

- Mechanised Infantry – 6 battalions
- Motorised Infantry – 14 battalions
- Light Infantry – 3 battalions
- Parachute Infantry – 1 battalion
- Air Assault Infantry – 2 battalions

== Infantry Types ==
Within the South African Army, there are six main types of infantry:

=== Type 1: Parachute Infantry ===
44 Parachute Regiment (Bloemfontein) – a brigade sized regiment consisting of the following units:

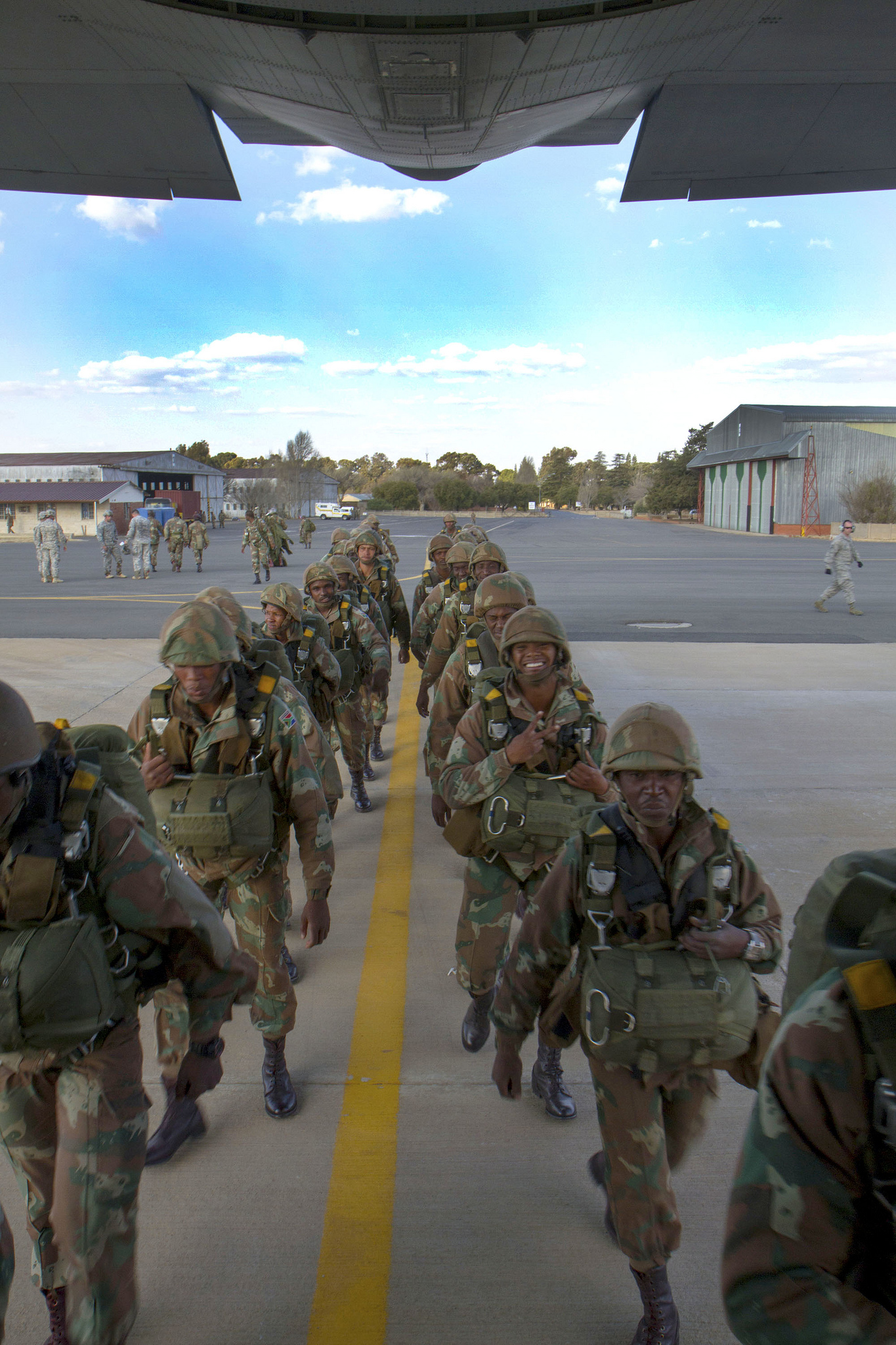
SANDF Parachute Infantry from 44 Parachute Regiment board a C-130 Hercules aircraft

Regular Force

- 1 Parachute Battalion (Bloemfontein)
- 44 Pathfinder Platoon, (Bloemfontein)
- 44 Training Wing, (Bloemfontein)

Reserve Force

- 3 Parachute Battalion, (Bloemfontein)

=== Type 2: Air Assault Infantry ===
Air Assault infantry are trained to be deployed using helicopters.

Regular Force

- 6 South African Infantry Battalion (Grahamstown)

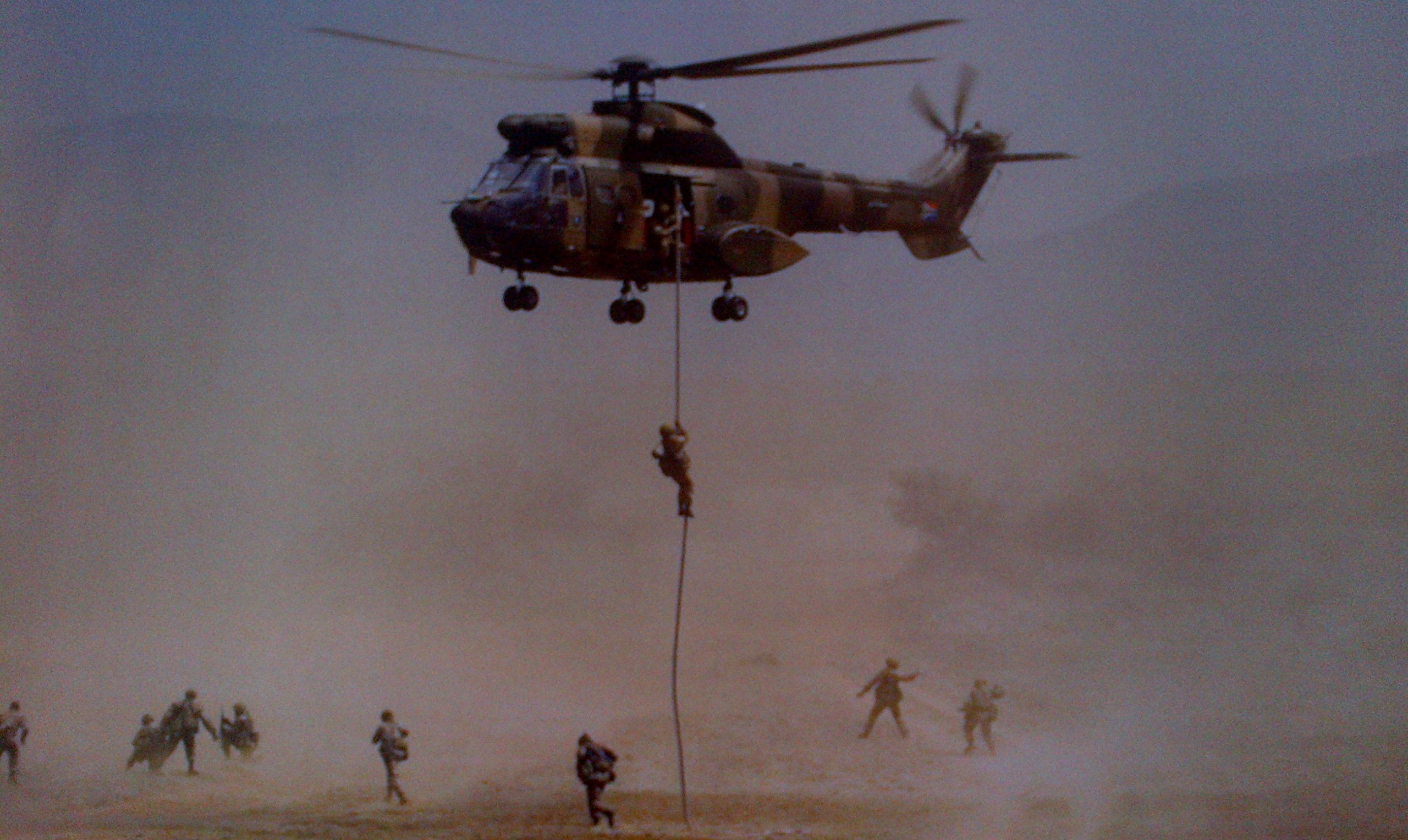
SANDF Air Assault Infantry

Reserve Force

- Chief Makhanda Regiment (Grahamstown)
- Chief Maqoma Regiment (Port Elizabeth)

=== Type 3: Seaborne Infantry ===
Regular Force

- 9 South African Infantry Battalion (Cape Town)
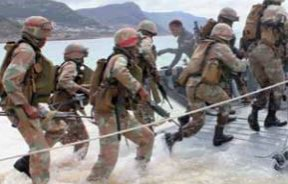
  SANDF Seaborne Infantry

Reserve Force

- Chief Langalibalele Rifles (Cape Town)

=== Type 4: Light Infantry ===
Fast highly mobile skirmishers.

Regular Force

- 21 South African Infantry Battalion (Johannesburg)
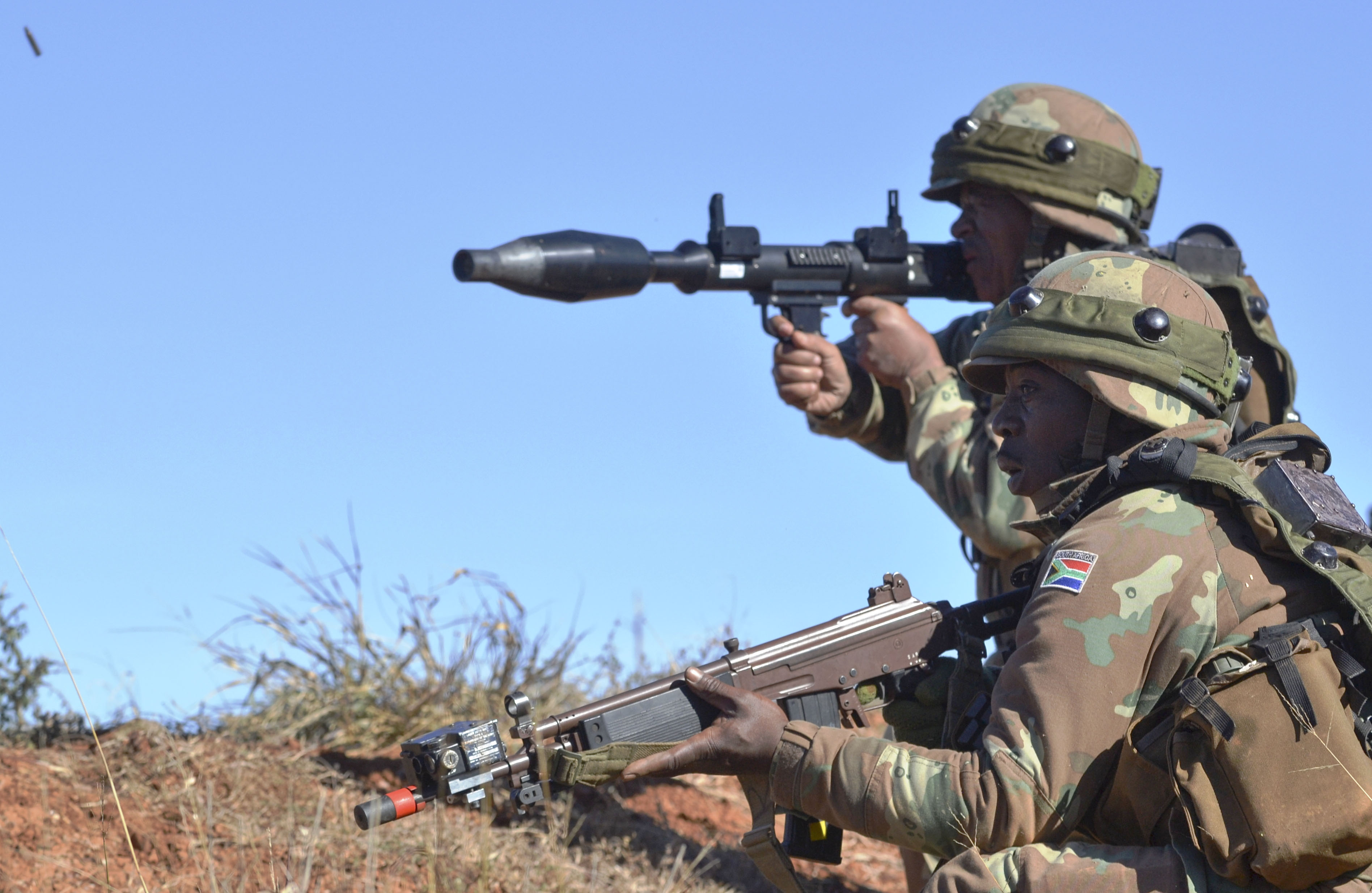
  SANDF Light Infantry during Exercise Shared Accord 2013

Reserve Force

- Rand Light Infantry (Johannesburg)
- OR Tambo Regiment (Germiston)
- Lenong Regiment (Krugersdorp)

=== Type 5: Mechanised Infantry ===
Mechanised infantry are equipped with the Ratel infantry combat vehicle, a wheeled vehicle that can deploy over all terrain.

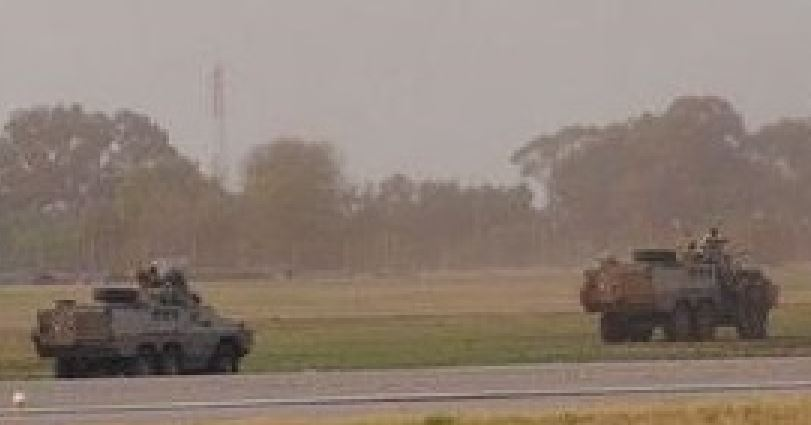
SANDF Mechanised Infantry Ratel Vehicles in fire and move at AAD 2014

Regular Force

- 1 South African Infantry Battalion (Bloemfontein)
- 8 South African Infantry Battalion (61 Mechanised Infantry Battalion Group was merged into this unit) (Upington)

Reserve Force

- General de la Rey Regiment (Potchefstroom)
- Job Masego Regiment (Pretoria)
- Cape Town Highlanders Regiment (Cape Town)
- General Jan Smuts Regiment (Cape Town)
- Bambatha Rifles (Johannesburg)

=== Type 6: Motorised Infantry ===
Motorised infantry are equipped with various Samil trucks, that can be deployed over rough terrain, but is primarily a road vehicle. Since the mid-2000s, they have been using vehicles like Mamba.

Regular Force

- 2 South African Infantry Battalion (Zeerust)
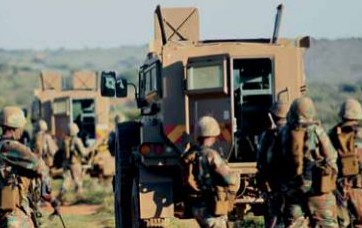
  SANDF Motorised Infantry with Mambas
- 4 South African Infantry Battalion (Middelburg, Mpumalanga)
- 5 South African Infantry Battalion (Ladysmith)
- 7 South African Infantry Battalion (Phalaborwa)
- 10 South African Infantry Battalion (Mafikeng)
- 14 South African Infantry Battalion (Mthatha)
- 15 South African Infantry Battalion (Thohoyandou)
- 121 South African Infantry Battalion (Mtubatuba)

Reserve Force

- General Botha Regiment (Barberton)
- Mapungubwe Regiment (Polokwane)
- Johannesburg Regiment (Johannesburg)
- Andrew Mlangeni Regiment (Johannesburg)
- Solomon Mahlangu Regiment (Johannesburg)
- Tshwane Regiment (Pretoria) (Note: Before December 2002, the name "Tshwane Regiment" was 'recently' approved to be in line with the area where the Regiment is situated. This Regiment was originally established as the Yskor Pretoria Commando in 1969 and over the years several commando units and regiments, such as Hillcrest, Munitoria, Regiment Pretorius and 2 Regiment Noord-Transvaal were amalgamated with Regiment Schanskop. Regiment Schanskop appears to have become the Tshwane Regiment around 2002.)
- Buffalo Volunteer Rifles (East London)
- Durban Light Infantry (Durban)
- King Shaka Regiment (Durban)
- Kimberley Regiment (Kimberley)
- Ingobamakhosi Carbineers (Pietermaritzburg)
- Mangaung Regiment (Bloemfontein)
- Nelson Mandela Regiment (Port Elizabeth)
- Chief Albert Luthuli Regiment (Kroonstad)

=== Infantry Battalion internal organization ===
The organisation of South African motorised, mechanised, air assault and parachute infantry battalions are broadly similar, the mechanised battalion however lacks a machine gun platoon in the support company and the internal security battalion lacks the same as well as other support weapons (mortars, antitank weapons and assault pioneers).

A battalion musters about 34 officers, 776 men, or 810 all ranks. A company has nine rifle sections. A battalion has nine rifle platoons and 27 rifle sections.

A battalion has at its disposal the following weapons:

- 8 M3 81 mm mortars
- 27 M4 60 mm patrol mortars
- 6 infantry antitank guns (M40A1 or Ratel 90)
- 6 antitank guided missile launchers (MBDA Milan ADT3 or Ratel ZT3)
- 4 Browning 12.7mm HMG and four Denel Y3 AGL (not in the mechanised infantry)
- 27 7.62mm GPMG and
- 9 RPG7 rocket-propelled grenade launchers (one per rifle platoon)

The number of vehicles is dependent on the type of unit and role. A parachute or air assault battalion deployed by air will largely be dependent on the 104 LMT Gecko airborne amphibious 8x8 light rapid deployment logistic vehicles assigned to 44 Parachute Regiment. The number deployed will depend on the airlift available.

By some accounts, a Fighting Echelon (F-Echelon) would include 88 A-Vehicles, but the numbers can be higher. In September 2008 the motorised 5 SAI Bn deployed 113 Casspir armoured personnel and weapon carriers to a force preparation exercise (Seboka) and the mechanised 8 SAI Bn deployed 107 Ratels. The A- and B-Echelons, fully mobilised, can muster up at least another 90 B-Vehicles of various types.

== Training ==
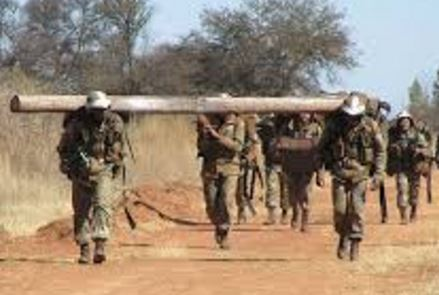
SANDF Infantry field Physical Training (PT)

All basic infantry training is done at 3 South African Infantry Battalion Training Depot at Kimberley. This is a Regular Force unit. Second phase deals with specific equipment, weapons and tactics, general and specific to the type of Infantry, and is dealt with at the unit and its training areas.

Third phase ramps up to a conventional warfare exercise usually held at Lohatla Army Battle School. Tactics such as fire and movement, as well as the amalgamation with other type formations, are done here, with expanding the scope from the squad to section to the platoon to company, battalion, and brigade exercises.

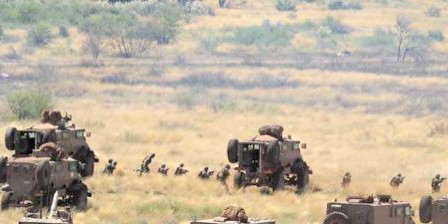
SANDF Infantry Fire and Movement Training

More specialized training is done on an ad-hoc basis.

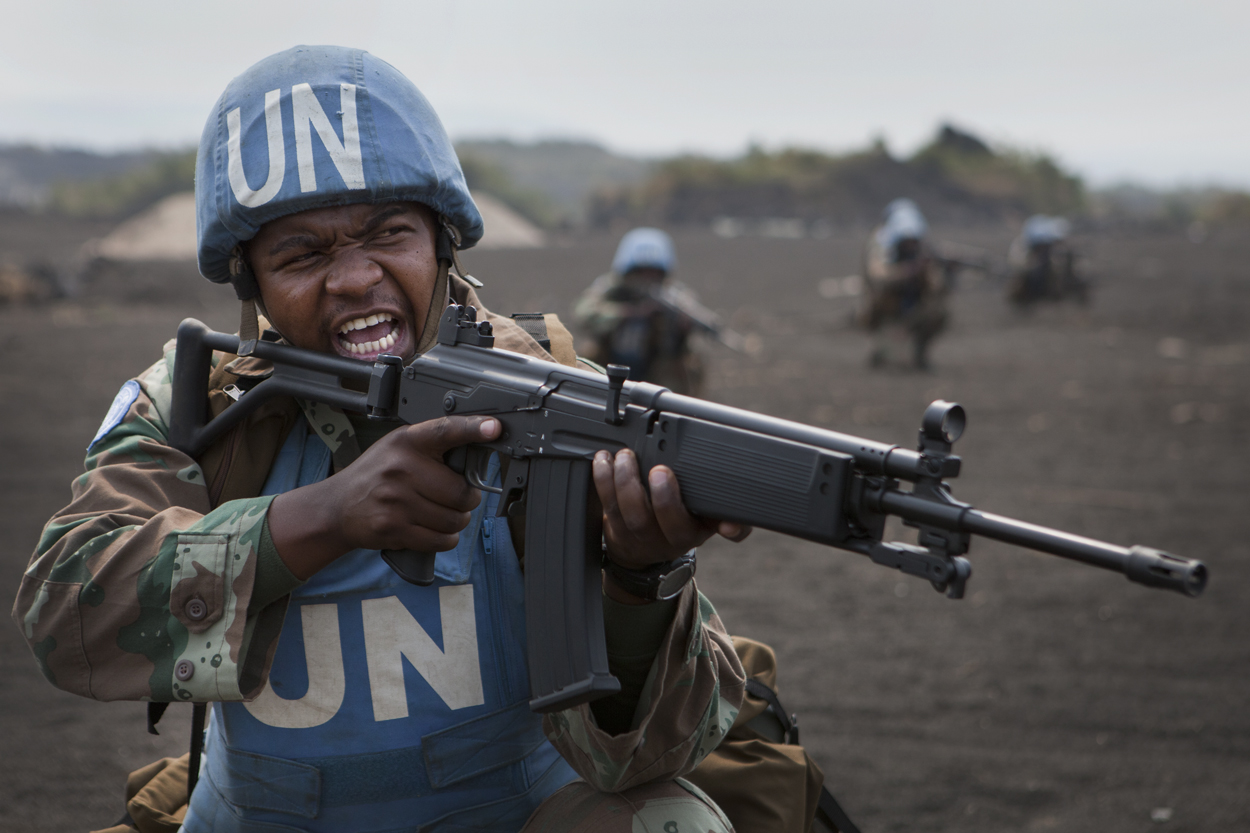
United Nations Force Intervention Brigade training

== Equipment ==
South African Infantry are trained in an assortment of equipment in addition to their personal rifles, such as:

Name	Type	Origin	Photo	Notes
Vektor Z88 pistol	Semi-automatic pistol	(South Africa)		15-round magazine standard-issue sidearm. License-built Beretta 92F.
Vektor SP1/SP2 pistol	Semi-automatic pistol	(South Africa)		Multiple variants 9mm and .40 S&W Improved 9mm version of the Z-88 pistol
Vektor R4 and R5 assault rifles	Assault rifle	(South Africa)		Multiple variants
Fabrique National Belgic Light Machine Gun	General-purpose machine gun	(Belgium)		7.62mm variant
M-4 commando mortar	Fire support	(South Africa)		60 mm high explosive
Denel Land Systems SS-77	General Purpose Machine Gun	(South Africa)		5.56mm and 7.62mm variants
Remington Arms	Pump action shotgun	(United States)		12 gauge
RPG-7	Rocket Propelled Grenade Launcher	(Russia)		40mm 7 kg high explosive
Milkor MGL	Grenade launcher	(South Africa)		40mm high explosive
Denel Y3 AGL	Automatic grenade launcher	(South Africa)		40mm high explosive
M1919 Browning	Medium machine gun	(United States)		7.62mm
M2 Browning	Heavy machine gun	(United States)		12.7mm
M40 recoilless rifle	Recoilless gun	(United States)		
MILAN ER	Anti-tank guided missile	(France)		
M61 Grenade	Fragmentation grenade	(United States)		

== Alliances ==
While South Africa was part of the British Commonwealth, many units formed alliances with British and other units. With the advent of the Republic in 1961, almost all of these alliances fell away either as a natural consequence of changing alliances or on instructions from the authorities. Some units have maintained the alliances unofficially.

With the change of government in 1994, South Africa once again became officially part of the Commonwealth, so alliances are once again possible.

Some examples of alliances:

- United Kingdom – The Rifles; 5 Infantry Battalion
- United Kingdom – The Royal Welsh; 121 Infantry Battalion

== Battle Honours ==
Many South African units have a history reflected in the Battle Honours they have received.

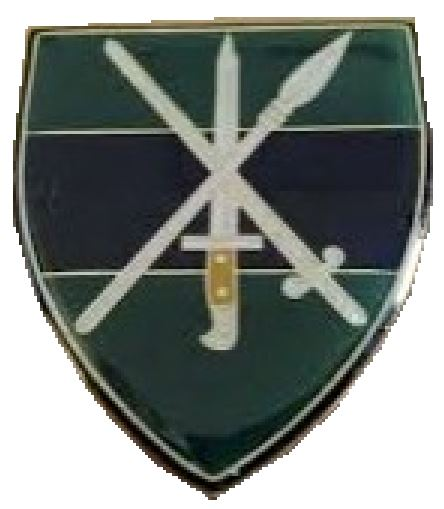
SANDF Infantry Flash
