= Natal Command =

South African Army military command

Part of
- Union Defence Force
- South African Defence Force
- South African National Defence Force
- Durban, South Africa

Site information
- Type: Command (military formation)

Location
- Coordinates: 29°50′20.2878″S 31°2′4.0488″E

Garrison information
- Current commander: None
- Past commanders: See Leadership table

Natal Command was a Command of the South African Army. It was headquartered in Durban, South Africa. By the 1980s, it was responsible for the security of the region, forming the primary level of command for military operations in support of the Police. It also provided logistic, administrative and service support to units and formations operating in its area of responsibility.

== History ==
=== Union Defence Force ===
Under the Union Defence Force, South Africa was originally divided into 9 military districts. Lieutenant Colonel J. Daniel SAStC was Officer Commanding on 3 September 1939. The command included the 1st South African Brigade at Pietermaritzburg with two battalions of the Royal Natal Carabineers and the Umvoti Mounted Rifles, the 7th South African Infantry Brigade (including the Natal Mounted Rifles), two batteries of the South African Permanent Garrison Artillery, and the Natal Field Artillery on 3 September 1939.

Brigadiers Harold Willmott and Deon Ferreira served as officers commanding Natal Command after the Second World War.

=== SADF ===
From August 1974 84 Motorised Brigade was based at the Old Fort Road Military Base in Durban. While the brigade was part of 8th South African Armoured Division rather than Natal Command, its units were mostly located within the command's boundaries. These included the Durban Light Infantry (located nearby in their historic buildings within the Greyville Racecourse), the Durban Regiment, 84 Signal Unit SACS, 15 Maintenance Unit SAOSC, 19 Field Engineer Regiment SAEC, and Natal Field Artillery. Other units seemingly associated with the brigade included the First City Regiment and Regiment Port Natal, both infantry units.

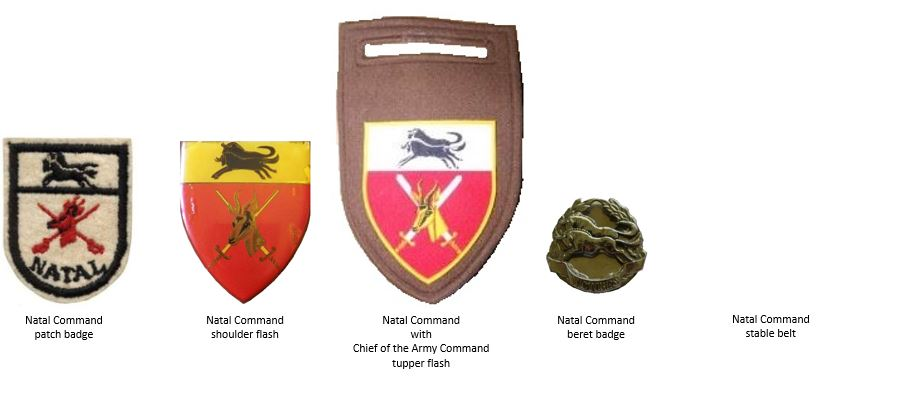
SADF era Natal Command insignia

In the early 1980s, the command included headquarters at Durban, 5 South African Infantry Battalion at Ladysmith, 15 Maintenance Unit in Durban, and two Commandos, the Tugela Commando and the Umvoti Commando, (Note: Incorrectly called Umvoiti Commando by Keegan) both based in Durban. It seems reasonably clear that in the research for World Armies a number of units assigned to the command at the time were missed.

84 Motorised Brigade became 9 South African Division in 1992, and later 75 Brigade, before disbanding c. 1999 with the creation of the 'type' formations.

=== Groups and Commandos ===
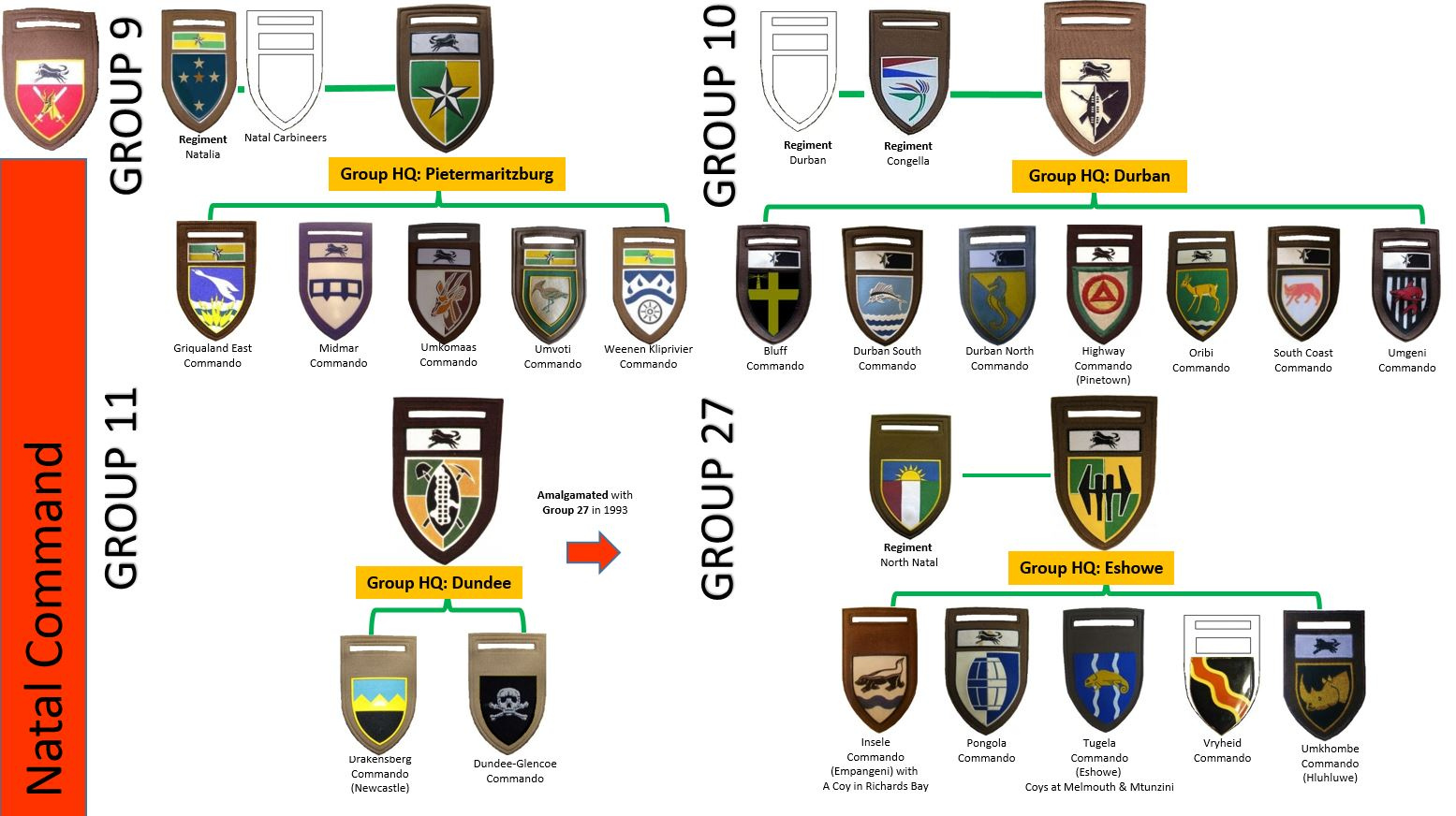
SADF era Natal Command Commando structure

For Territorial forces a structure of "groups" was established during the 1980s. Each of these regional groups fell under the authority of a Command and exercised operational control over a number of units, mostly Commandos.

Natal Command had three Groups (originally four) under command.

==== Group 9 (Pietermaritzburg) ====
- Midland Commando
- Midmar Commando
- Natalia Commando
- Umkomaas Commando
- Umvoti Commando
- Weenan-Kliprivier Commando
- Griqualand East Commando

==== Group 10 (Montclair) ====
- Bluff Commando
- Durban North Commando
- Durban South Commando
- Highway Commando
- Oribi Commando
- South Coast Commando
- Umgeni Commando

==== Group 11 (Dundee) ====
- Drakensberg Commando
- Dundee and District Commando

==== Group 27 (Eshowe) ====
- Insele Commando
- Northern Natal Commando
- Pongola Commando
- Tugela Commando
- Umkhombe Commando

=== SANDF ===
SANDF director of facilities Brigadier General G Mngadi said the beach front property, formerly occupied by Headquarters Natal Command and later by the Joint Operations Division's eastern Joint Tactical Headquarters, “was leased by the National Department of Public Works for the South African Defence Force on a 99 year lease from the erstwhile Durban Corporation, now known as the Ethekweni Municipality.” Mngadi says that as a result of the consolidation of the facilities footprint in Durban, the facility had become superfluous and was returned to the city on October 16, 2009.

== Leadership ==
Natal Command
From	Officers Commanding	To	Ribbon
1 November 1926	Col J. H. Breytenbach DSO	30 June 1933	Distinguished Service Order DSO
1 July 1933	Col K. R. Van Der Spy MC	22 January 1937	Military Cross MC
23 January 1937	Lt Col John Daniel CBE,SAStC	14 February 1940	Order of the British Empire CBE South African Staff Corps SAStC
15 April 1940	Col B F Armstrong DSO (Note: Later Major General)	11 June 1940	Distinguished Service Order DSO
12 June 1940	Col John Daniel CBE,SAStC	16 June 1944	Order of the British Empire CBE South African Staff Corps SAStC
17 June 1944	Col W. T. B. Tasker OBE	12 January 1945	Order of the British Empire OBE
13 January 1945	Lt Col W. Grewe-Brown	21 January 1945	
15 February 1945	Brig J. B. Kriegler CBE	17 May 1945	Order of the British Empire CBE
4 June 1945	Col H. C. Daniel CBE,MC,AFC (Note: Later Brigadier)	18 October 1953	Order of the British Empire CBE Military Cross MC Air Force Cross (United Kingdom) AFC
19 October 1953	Brig W. H. Hingeston CBE	30 June 1955	Order of the British Empire CBE
1 July 1955	Col C. S. Leisegang DSO	12 February 1956	Distinguished Service Order DSO
16 Dec 1956	Col P. J. Jacobs SM,SSA (Note: Later Chief of the South African Army)	30 January 1958	Southern Cross Medal SM Star of South Africa SSA
1 February 1958	Col C. A. Frazer SM	31 July 1963	Southern Cross Medal SM
1 August 1963	Col P. F. Van Der Hoven	30 June 1966	
1 July 1966	Brig P. E. Ferguson SM,MC,ED	31 May 1968	Southern Cross Medal SM Military Cross MC Efficiency Decoration (South Africa) ED
1 June 1968	Brig J. W. Blatt SM	31 December 1970	Southern Cross Medal SM
1 January 1971	Brig I. S. Guilford SM	16 January 1973	Southern Cross Medal SM
17 January 1973	Brig P. S. I. Jay SM	31 December 1973	Southern Cross Medal SM
1 January 1974	Brig H. C. Davies SM	31 December 1977	Southern Cross Medal SM
1 January 1978	Brig C. J. Lloyd SSAG,SD,SM,MMM (Note: Later Lieutenant General) (Note: Later GOC South West African Territorial Force)	21 November 1980	Star of South Africa SSAG Southern Cross Decoration SD Southern Cross Medal SM Military Merit Medal MMM
22 November 1980	Brig P.E.K. Bosman SM	31 August 1983	Southern Cross Medal SM
1 September 1983	Brig M. B. Anderson	31 December 1985	
1 January 1986	Brig J. H. Pretorius SD,SM,MMM	31 July 1992	Southern Cross Decoration SD Southern Cross Medal SM Military Merit Medal MMM
n.d.	Brig Harold Willmott CBE (Note: Unconfirmed by other sources)	n.d.	Order of the British Empire CBE
14 July 1992	Brig Deon Ferreira PVD,SD,SM,MMM (Note: Later Chief of Joint Operations)	17 February 1995	Pro Virtute Decoration PVD Southern Cross Decoration SD Southern Cross Medal SM Military Merit Medal MMM
18 February 1995	Brig C. E. le Roux SD,SM,MMM	23 November 2000	Southern Cross Decoration SD Southern Cross Medal SM Military Merit Medal MMM
From	Garrison / Command Sergeants Major	To	Ribbon
1 Jul 1927	WO1 J. H. Nassey	31 May 1936	
1 Jun 1936	WO1 S. J. Riley	3 May 1940	
1 May 1940	WO2 K. W. Van Wijk	28 Feb 1941	
1 Mar 1941	WO1 E. A. Aylett	30 Jun 1946	
1 Jul 1946	WO1 K. N. Van Wijk	30 Nov 1946	
1 Dec 1946	WO1 T. W. Rochwell	31 Dec 1962	
29 Jul 1966	WO1 E. H. van den Bergh	31 May 1971	
1 Jun 1971	WO1 R. H . Ueckermann	30 Apr 1974	
1 May 1974	WO1 D. J. Maritz	13 May 1982	
14 May 1982	WO1 P. H. Rohrbeck PMM	30 Sep 1992	Pro Merito Medal PMM
1 Oct 1992	WO1 J. T. Moorcroft PMD,VRM (Note: Later Sgt Major of the Army)	1 Nov 1993	Pro Merito Decoration PMD Van Riebeeck Medal VRM
2 Nov 1993	WO1 J.M. Goodrich PMM,MMM	nd	Pro Merito Medal PMM Military Merit Medal MMM

== See also ==
- South African Army Order of Battle 1940
