= Galgut =

Galgut is a surname. Notable people with the surname include:

- Brian Galgut (born 1937), South African lawyer and judge
- Damon Galgut (born 1963), South African playwright and novelist
- Oscar Galgut (1906–1999), South African lawyer and Judge of Appeal in the Supreme Court of Appeal
