= Charles 'Pop' Fraser =

South African military commander

Lieutenant General Charles Alan Fraser SSA SM
- Born: 6 April 1915; Mooi River, Natal, Union of South Africa
- Died: 18 December 1994 (aged 79); Howick, KwaZulu-Natal, South Africa
- Spouse: Nancy Frances Margaret Ford (m. 1939; died 1986)
- Military career
- Allegiance: Republic of South Africa
- Branch: South African Army
- Service years: 1934–1973
- Rank: Lieutenant General
- Nicknames: Pop, Alan
- Commands: Chief of the Army
- Wars: World War II
- Awards
- Other work: South African Ambassador to Iran

Lieutenant-General Charles Alan 'Pop' Fraser SSA SM (6 April 1915 – 18 December 1994) was a South African military commander. He joined the South African Army as a part-time Active Citizen Force soldier in 1934, and became a full-time Permanent Force member in 1946. He served in World War II.

With the rank of captain, he completed the 5th Senior Staff Duties War course at the British Middle East Staff College, Haifa in Palestine during the period from 8 September - 31 December 1941.

During World War II, the Cape Field Artillery was amalgamated with the 6th Field Regiment, South African Artillery, in September 1943. On 1 October 1943 became 1/6 Field Regiment. Fraser, as a lieutenant-colonel assumed command of this regiment on 21 October 1944 when Lt-Col Kay, officer commanding, died of wounds. Fraser was in turn succeeded by Lt-Col IB Whyte.

He served as Chief of the Army from 1966 to 1967, and as General Officer Commanding Joint Combat Forces, co-ordinating Army and Air Force operations and training, from 1967 to 1973. As GOCJCF, he was the third-highest-ranking officer in the South African Defence Force's Supreme Command.

== Awards and decorations ==
- Star of South Africa (1952) (SSA)
- Southern Cross Medal (1952) (SM)
- Union Medal
- 1939–45 Star
- Africa Star (8th Army Clasp)
- Italy Star
- Defence Medal (United Kingdom)
- War Medal 1939–1945
- Africa Service Medal (WWII)

== See also ==
- List of South African military chiefs
- South African National Defence Force

Diplomatic posts
Preceded by Alan John Coxley	Ambassador to Imperial Iran; 1973 – 1979	Vacant Title next held by Moosa Moolla in 1994
Military offices
Preceded by Nick Bierman	GOC Joint Combat Forces; 1967 – 1973	Post Abolished
New title Post renamed	Chief of the South African Army; 1966 – 1967	Succeeded by Willem Louw
Preceded by Petrus Jacobs	South African Army Chief of Staff; 1965 – 1966	Post renamed
Preceded by Petrus Jacobs	OC Natal Command c. 1958 – c. 1960	Succeeded by Carl Leisegang
Preceded by Lesley Duncan Kay	OC 6th Field Artillery; 1944 – 1945	Succeeded by IB Whyte
