= General Jacob =

General Jacob may refer to:

- Claud Jacob (1863–1948), British Indian Army general
- Ian Jacob (1899–1993), British Army lieutenant general
- J. F. R. Jacob (1921–2016), Indian Army lieutenant general
- John Jacob (East India Company officer) (1812–1858), British East India Company brigadier general

== See also ==
- Petrus Jacobs (1910-1967), South African Army major general
