= Sybrand =

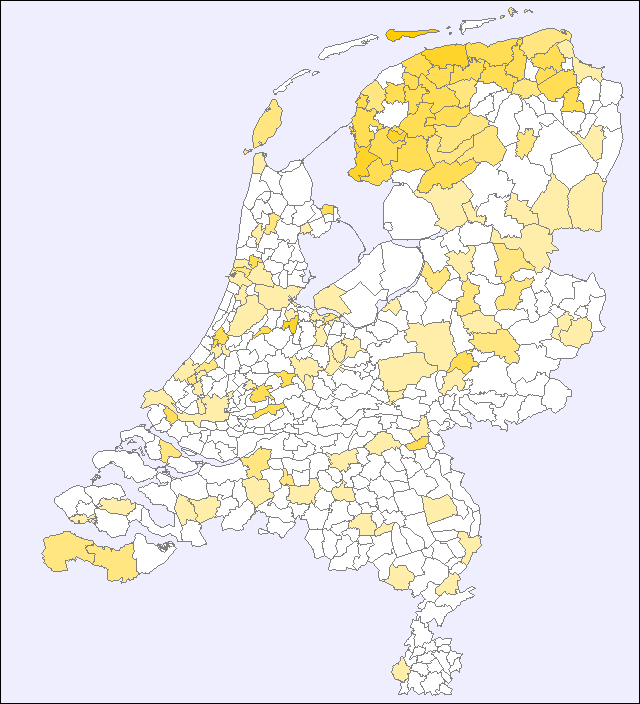
Distribution map of males registered at birth before 2018 with the first name Sybrand in the Netherlands. Given per municipality and in % of the population.

Sybrand is a masculine given name. Notable people with the name include:

- Sybrand Engelbrecht (cricketer) (born 1988), South African cricketer
- Sybrand Engelbrecht (soldier) (1913–1994), South African Army general
- Sybrand van Haersma Buma (born 1965), Dutch politician
