= Sybrand Engelbrecht =

Sybrand Engelbrecht may refer to:

- Sybrand Engelbrecht (cricketer)
- Sybrand Engelbrecht (soldier), South African military commander
