= KSR =

KSR may refer to:

- Kam Sheung Road station, Hong Kong; MTR station code
- Kendall Square Research, former supercomputer company, Cambridge, Massachusetts, US
- Keyboard Send Receive, a type of teleprinter made by Teletype Corporation
- KSR v. Teleflex, a US patent lawsuit
- Katahdin Scout Reservation, a BSA camp in Maine, US
- King Shaka Regiment, an infantry regiment of the South African Army
- Korean State Railway, North Korea state railways
- KSR1 (kinase suppressor of Ras 1), an enzyme and gene
- Kim Stanley Robinson, science fiction writer
- Kuranda Scenic Railway, a tourist railway between Kuranda and Cairns, Queensland, Australia
