= No. 3 (S.A.) Wing =

3 Wing SAAF
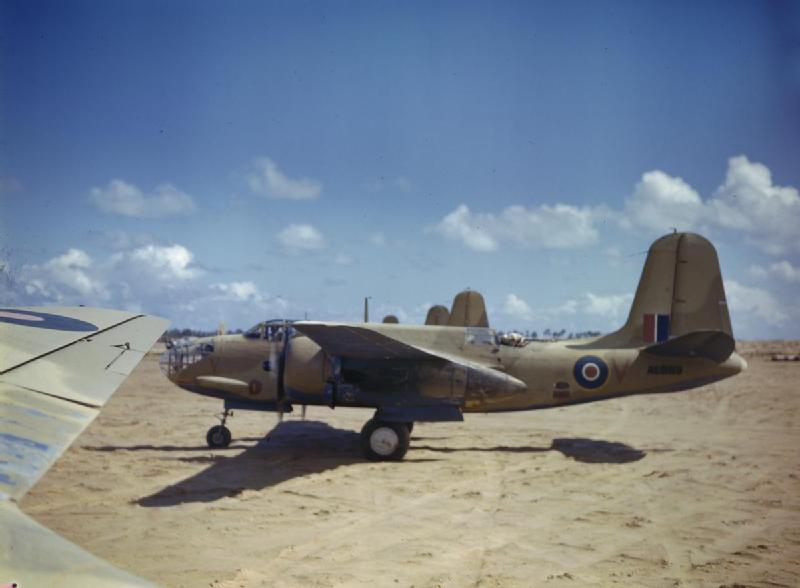
- Douglas Boston light bomber of 24 Squadron, 3 (SA) Wing: 1943
- Active: 1939 to 1945
- Country: South Africa
- Branch: South African Air Force
- Role: Light bombing
- Size: Wing

Commanders
- Commander: Col. H.G. Wilmot (November 1941 - )
- Commander: Col H.J. Martin ( - May 1943)
- Commander: Col. J.T. Durant (28 April 1943 - )

No. 3 (S.A.) Wing was a South African Air Force commanded formation during World War II that served in North Africa, Sicily and Italy. The formation was recommended by HQ RAF Middle East on 28 October 1941 to the Air Ministry and authorised by AIR54/96 on 3 November 1941. The Wing initially consisted of Royal Air Force and South African Air Force squadrons under South African command: No. 11 Squadron RAF and No. 113 Squadron RAF with Bristol Blenheim bombers and fighters and No. 12 Squadron SAAF, No. 21 Squadron SAAF (both with Martin Maryland bombers and No. 24 Squadron SAAF with Douglas Boston bombers. The latter unit was re-assigned to Army Cooperation before the start of Operation Crusader while No. 113 Squadron was assigned to Whitforce. This left 12, 21 Squadrons SAAF plus No. 11 Squadron RAF as its assigned units, with additional units being assigned later. Two RAF squadrons left for the Far East when Japan declared war in December 1941.

Air Chief Marshal Sir Arthur Longmore proposed the formation of the first South African Air force Wing and later, perhaps a SAAF Group within the RAF organisational structure. Such a Group however never came into existence and although the SAAF fielded two operational wings in North Africa, they were never deployed as a group or as an independent air force.

== History ==
It was designated as a light bomber wing and its squadrons flew Douglas Boston Mk IIIs and Martin Marauder Mk II bombers in North Africa until 1943. The Wing was assigned a company of infantry for ground protection which was initially provided by South African forces and by a Free French company as from end April 1942.

== Organisation and Squadrons ==
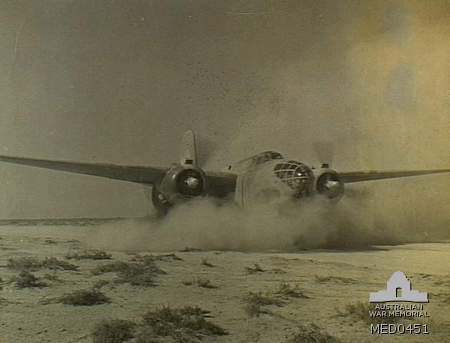
A 3 (SA) Wing Boston taking off in the Western Desert, 1942

No. 3 (S.A.) Wing organisation: Western Desert: 1941 - 1943
Date	Assigned Squadrons	Wing Commander	Higher formation
3 November 1941	12 Squadron SAAF; 21 Squadron SAAF; 24 Squadron SAAF; No. 11 Squadron RAF (left when Japan declared war December 1941); No. 113 Squadron RAF (left when Japan declared war December 1941)	Lt.Col. H.G. Wilmot	
11 November 1941	12 Squadron SAAF; 21 Squadron SAAF; 24 Squadron SAAF; No. 11 Squadron RAF (left when Japan declared war December 1941)	Lt.Col. H.G. Wilmot	Western Desert Air Force
