= Plascon-Evans v Van Riebeeck Paints =

South African legal case

Plascon-Evans Paints Ltd v Van Riebeeck Paints (Pty) Ltd is an important case in South African law, particularly in the area of civil procedure and trade marks.

This appeal from a decision in the Cape Provincial Division was heard in the Appellate Division by Corbett JA, Miller JA, Nicholas JA, Galgut AJA and Howard AJA on February 27, 1984, with judgment handed down on May 21, 1984. The appellant's attorneys were Spoor & Fisher, Pretoria, and Israel & A Sackstein, Bloemfontein. The respondent's attorneys were Scher Webner & Co, Cape Town, and Lovius, Block, Meltz, Steyn & Yazbek, Bloemfontein.

The court found that a qualification was necessary to the general rule regarding final interdicts in motion proceedings. Sometimes the denial by the respondent of a fact alleged by the applicant may not be such as to raise a real, genuine or bona fide dispute of fact. If the respondent in such a case has failed to apply for the deponents concerned to be called for cross-examination, and if the court is satisfied as to the inherent credibility of the applicant's averments, the court may decide the disputed fact in the applicant's favour, without hearing oral evidence. This has come to be known as the "Plascon-Evans rule." When factual disputes arise, therefore, relief should be granted only if the facts stated by the respondent, together with the admitted facts in the applicant's affidavits, justify the order. The court noted there may be exceptions to this general rule, as where the allegations or denials are so far-fetched that the court is justified in rejecting them on the papers.

It seemed to the court that the definition of "trade mark" in section 2 of the Trade Marks Act was not appropriate to infringement proceedings. It seemed also that the notional-user test, deployed by the courts to determine whether or not there has been an infringement of a trade mark, posed difficulties where the actual proven user fell outside of the ambit of the plaintiff's monopoly.

The court found that the intention of the legislature in section 46(b) of the Act was to safeguard the use by the trader of words which were fairly descriptive of his goods and genuinely used for the purpose of describing the character and quality of those goods. Such use must not be a device for the achievement of some ulterior object.

== Judgment ==
The rule was formulated in Stellenbosch Farmers' Winery Ltd v Stellenvale Winery (Pty) Ltd that, where there is a dispute as to the facts, a final interdict should be granted in motion proceedings only if the facts as stated by the respondents, together with the admitted facts in the applicant's affidavit, justify such an order, or where it is clear that the facts, although not formally admitted, cannot be denied and must be regarded as admitted.

The court in the present matter found that this required clarification and perhaps qualification. In certain cases the denial by the respondent of a fact alleged by the applicant may not be such as to raise a real, genuine or bona fide dispute of fact. If, in such a case, the respondent has not availed himself of his right to apply for the deponents concerned to be called for cross-examination under Rule 6(5)(g) of the Uniform Rules of Court, and the court is satisfied as to the inherent credibility of the applicant's factual averment, it may proceed on the basis of the correctness thereof and include this fact among those upon which it determines whether the applicant is entitled to the final relief which he seeks. There may be exceptions to this general rule, as where the allegations or denials of the respondent are so far-fetched or clearly untenable that the court is justified in rejecting them merely on the papers.

It appeared to the court that, when considering whether or not an alleged infringer of the rights of the proprietor of a registered trade mark had unauthorisedly used a mark "as a trade mark" within the meaning of section 44(1)(a) of the Trade Marks Act, in certain situations problems would arise in the application of the statutory definition of "trade mark" in section 2 of the Act. It also appeared that the application of the notional-user test to determine infringement of a trade mark posed certain difficulties. If the actual proven user by the defendant fell outside the ambit of the plaintiff's monopoly, it could not be said that a notional fair and normal user of his mark, which had not in fact occurred, would trespass upon the plaintiff's monopoly.

What the legislature intended to safeguard by means of the provisions of section 46 (b) of the Act was the use by a trader, in relation to his goods, of words, which are fairly descriptive of his goods, genuinely for the purpose of describing the character or quality of the goods. The use of the words must not be a mere device to secure some ulterior object, as for example where the words are used in order to take advantage of the goodwill attaching to the registered trade mark of another.

The court held in casu that the use by the respondent, a dealer in paints and allied products, of the name "Mikacote" was an infringement of appellant's (also a dealer in paints) registered trade mark consisting of the word "Micatex." The court held, furthermore, that the word "Mikacote" was not a word in ordinary use but a fancy name which was not a fair description of the character or quality of the paint which it sold and was accordingly not protected by the provisions of s 46 (b) of the Act.

The decision of the full bench of the Cape Provincial Division, in Van Riebeeck Paints (Pty) Ltd v Plascon-Evans Paints (Pty) Ltd, was thus overruled.
