= 84 Motorised Brigade (South Africa) =

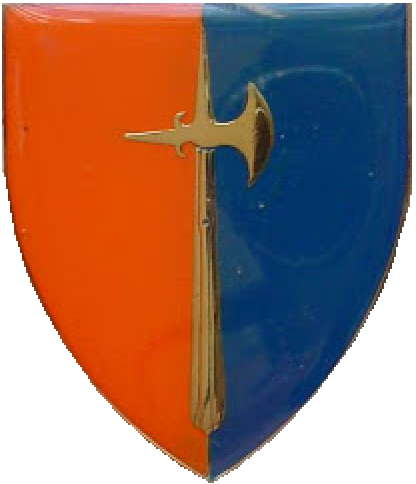
- 84 Motorised Brigade emblem
- Active: 1974–1992
- Country: South Africa
- Allegiance: South Africa
- Branch: South African Army
- Type: Motorised Brigade
- Part of: South African Composite Brigade
- Garrison: Durban
- Nickname: 84 Mot
- Motto: Ubukhali besizenze (The sharp end of the axe)
- Equipment: Ratel; Eland Mk7 90 mm and 60 mm Armoured Cars; Buffel; G2
- Engagements: South African Border War

Insignia
- 84 Mot Brigade Command Bar

84 Motorised Brigade was a formation of 8 South African Armoured Division, a combined arms force consisting of infantry, armour and artillery.

The brigade was formed on August 1, 1974 in Durban as part of the 8 South African Armoured Division. The brigade was located at Lords Grounds, which has a military history since 1842.

== Initial Structure ==
Under this reorganisation, the following units were transferred from Natal Command to the new command:

- Natal Mounted Rifles
- Umvoti Mounted Rifles
- Durban Light Infantry,
- Regiment Port Natal,
- Natal Field Artillery,
- 38 Field Workshop,
- 84 Signals Squadron,
- 19 Field Squadron,
- 21 Maintenance Unit

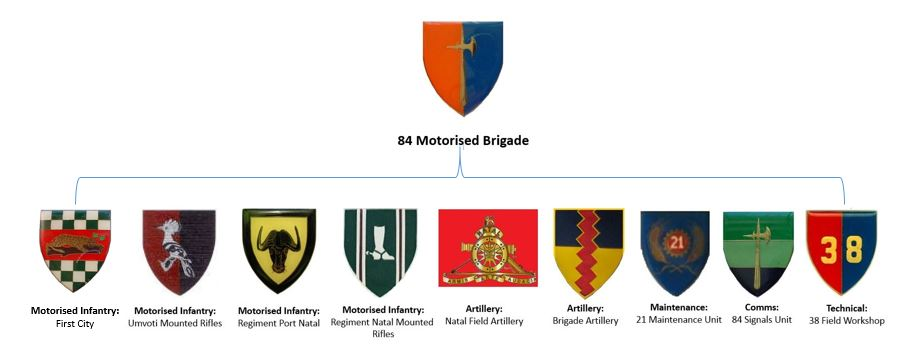
Structure SADF 84 Motorised Brigade

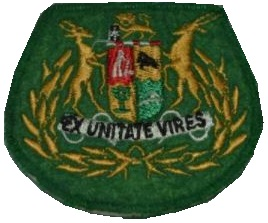
SADF era Brigade level Sergeant Major insignia

== Brigade Training and Exercises ==
As a Citizen Force formation, 84 Motorised Brigade would make use of call-up orders for its personnel to generally report for 3 months service. Headquarters staff would then leave for Lohatla, where a transfer camp would be established to process troops en route to the operational area in northern South West Africa. Processing of units would include personal documentation, a medical examination, inoculation and the issuing of equipment and weapons. Each unit on completion of the necessary processing, would entrain to the Olienhoutplaat Station for a six-day journey to Grootfontein, the railhead near the Operational Area. All 84 Brigades units had at one time or another served in the Operational Area and at the end of the Republic Festival celebrations in 1981 elements of 84 Motorised Brigade were airlifted from Durban for border duties.

== Insignia ==
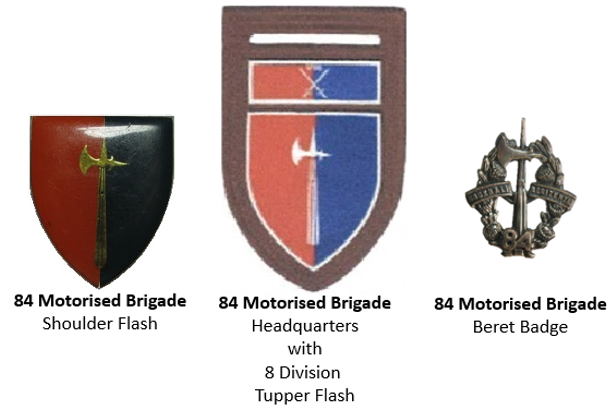
SADF era 84 Motorized Brigade insignia

== Leadership ==
84 Motorised Brigade Leadership
From	Officers Commanding	To	Ribbon
1974	Brig G.J. Wolmarans	n.d.	
n.d.	Col H.F.P. Riekert	n.d.	
n.d.	Col F.J. van Tonder	n.d.	
n.d.	Col P.J.W. Hall (Note: Former Commanding Officer of Bushmen Battalion at Omega in the Caprivi)	n.d.	
n.d.	Col Albert Drenth	n.d.	
From	Brigade Sergeant Major	To	Ribbon
n.d.	WO1 George Hattingh	n.d.	
