= Umvoti Mounted Rifles =

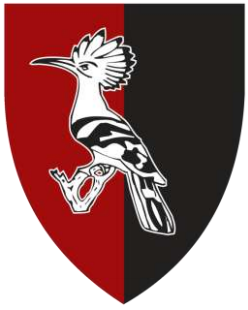
- SANDF Umvoti Mounted Rifles emblem
- Active: 16 May 1864 to present (162 years)
- Country: South Africa
- Allegiance: Republic of South Africa; Republic of South Africa
- Branch: South African Army; South African Army
- Type: Armoured Car Regiment
- Size: One Battalion
- Part of: South African Armoured Formation; Army Conventional Reserve
- Garrison/HQ: Pinetown
- Patron: King Zwelithini Goodwill ka Bhekuzulu
- Mottos: Toujours Pret (Always Ready)
- Anniversaries: 16 May (Regimental Day)
- Equipment: Rooikat armoured fighting vehicle
- Battle honours: South Africa 1879; South Africa 1899–1902; Relief of Ladysmith; Natal 1906; South West Africa 1914–1915; Gibeon; Western Desert 1941–43
- Website: http://www.umrhistory.com/

Commanders
- Current commander: Lt Col M.S.C. Magigaba

Insignia
- Beret Colour: Black
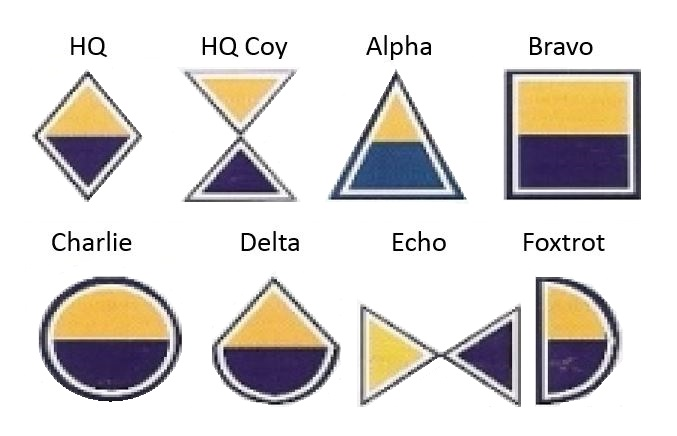
- Armour Squadron emblems

- Armour beret bar circa 1992

The Umvoti Mounted Rifles (named after the Umvoti River) is an armoured regiment of the South African Army. As a reserve unit, it has a status roughly equivalent to that of a British Army Reserve or United States Army National Guard unit. It is part of the South African Army Armour Formation and is based in the town of Pinetown.

== History ==
=== Origin ===
On 16 May 1864, 162 years ago, the Umvoti Mounted Rifles (UMR) was founded in Greytown as the Greytown Mounted Rifles. There were some 45 men in the original unit, under command of Capt A.S. Wyndham who was also the Magistrate of Greytown at the time.

The Umvoti Mounted Rifles Hall is the oldest hall in Greytown. It was built in 1880 as a Masonic Hall, but later became the headquarters of the Regiment. It is currently used by the Greytown public works department.

The Umvoti Mounted Rifles was formed in 1893 at Greytown, Natal by the redesignation of the left Wing of the Natal Carbineers. On 1 July 1913, the Regiment absorbed the Zululand Mounted Rifles, was redesignated the 4th Mounted Rifles (Umvoti Mounted Rifles) and transferred to the Active Citizen Force of the Union Defence Force. In 1934, the Regiment was redesignated as the Umvoti Mounted Rifles and converted to infantry.

=== Engagements and Wars ===
The Natal Mounted Rifles served in the Second Anglo-Boer War (1899–1902), the Zulu Rebellion (1906–1907), World War I (specifically in South-West Africa from 1914 to 1915), World War II and South Africa's post-war internal conflicts and "Border War".

=== Various musterings ===
The UMR since 1920 served under command of the OC, Natal Command as firstly a Mounted Regiment on horseback and then, from 1935 as a motorised infantry unit. In September 1939, they were part of the 1st South African Brigade of the Natal Command. During the Second World War, the Regiment served as an Infantry unit and, in 1954, was converted to a Tank Regiment and subsequently in 1962 into an armoured car regiment.

=== Affiliation with 8th Armoured Division ===
During 1984, the UMR was brigaded as the Armoured Car Regiment of 8th South African Armoured Division, 84 Motorised Brigade. This necessitated conversion from a county-insurgency unit to a conventional force and ended 74 years service with Natal Command. The unit was then the Armoured Car Reconnaissance regiment of 8 SA Division and was then part of 84 SA Brigade based in Durban, Natal.

=== Regimental Colours ===
In 1866, the first Regimental Colours of blue silk were presented to the Grey-town Mounted Rifles. In 1901, the regiment was again honoured by the presentation of colours by two Greytown ladies. In 1904, HRH Princess Helena, third daughter of Queen Victoria, presented the King's Colours to UMR. These have been consecrated and are housed in St James Church in Greytown for safekeeping. In 1964, the latest presentation of the Colours took place during the regiment's 100th birthday celebrations by Commandant-General P H Grobbelaar and incorporates the regimental badge in gold on a blue background which signi¬fies an armoured regiment.

=== National Colours ===
On 14 July 1990, National Colours were presented to the Regiment by Major General D J Mortimer.

=== Under the SANDF ===
In 1999, 84 SA Brigade was closed and the unit then fell under direct command of the South African Army Armoured Formation, and Umvoti Mounted Rifles was transferred to the new armoured 'type' formation, the South African Army Armoured Formation. The Regiment currently uses the Rooikat armoured fighting vehicle, equipped with a 76 mm quick-fire gun.

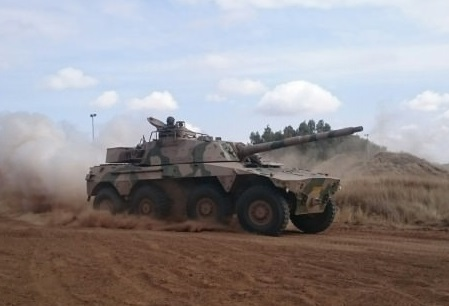
Rooikat Armoured Car

In 2012, the long-awaited new history of the regiment, written by historian Mark Coghlan, was published by Just Done Productions Publishing.

== Insignia ==
=== Previous dress insignia ===
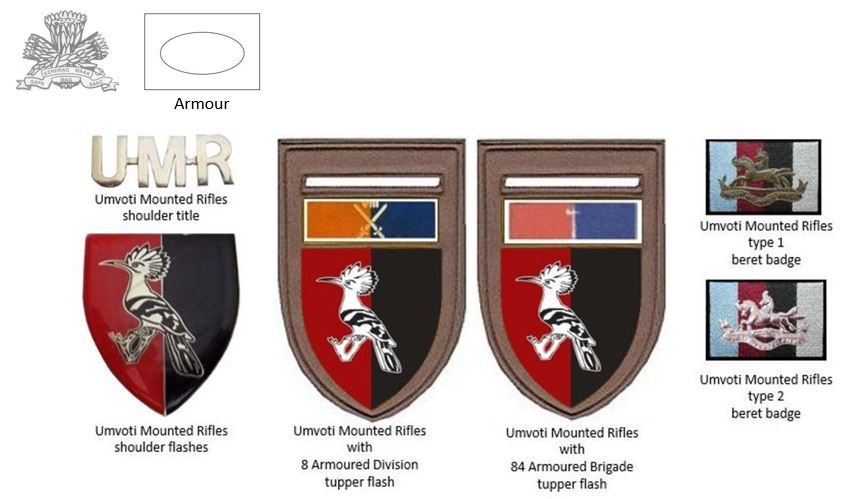
SADF era Umvoti Mounted Rifles insignia

== Leadership ==
Leadership
From	Honorary Colonels	To	Ribbon
1927	Maj Gen Alexandra Cambridge, Earl of Athlone	c. 1957	
1957	Col W S Slatter	c. 1967	
1968	Col C L J Crookes	c. 1985	
1995	Col S R Meyer	c. 2000	
2000	Col W R L Wilson	c. 2015	
2015	Lt Col L Palmer	Present	
From	Officers Commanding	To	Ribbon
1946	Lt Col V.H.E. Reiche	c. 1947	
1947	Lt Col W.S. Slatter	c. 1949	
1949	Cmdt O.C. Oftebro	c. 1957	
c. 1957	Cmdt C.L.J. Crookes (Note: Later Honorary Colonel)	c. 1959	
c. 1959	Cmdt R.G. Norman Smith	c. 1965	
c. 1965	Cmdt A.Z. Titiestad	c. 1967	
c. 1967	Cmdt A.J.S. Slatter	c. 1972	
c. 1972	Cmdt P.T. Menne	c. 1977	
c. 1977	Cmdt S.R. Meyer (Note: Later Colonel)	c. 1980	
c. 1980	Cmdt D.N.E. Leitch	c. 1984	
c. 1984	Cmdt D.H.E. Tweedie	c. 1987	
c. 1987	Cmdt J.W. Allchin	c. 1992	
c. 1992	Cmdt L.F. Stapelberg	c. 1994	
c. 1994	Cmdt W.R.L. Wilson	2000	
2000	Lt Col W. Pat Titlestad	2015	
2015	Lt Col David Quinton	2017	
2017	Lt Col M.S.C. Magigaba	Present	
From	Regimental Sergeants Major	To	Ribbon
c. 1946	WO1 J.S.S. Martens	c. 1955	
c. 1955	WO1 P.G. Renaud (Note: First term)	c. 1984	
c. 1984	WO1 J.L. Shardelow	c. 1988	
c. 1988	WO1 P.G. Renaud (Note: Second term)	c. 1995	
c. 1995	WO1 C.A. Greef	c. 1997	
c. 1997	WO1 C.E. Wilson	c. 2005	
c. 2005	WO1 A.R.J Morrison	c. 2017	
c. 2017	WO1 V.R. Chamier	Present	

== Freedom of entry ==
- Greytown
- Melmoth
- Empangeni
- Eshowe
- Pinetown
- Pietermaritzburg
- Ladysmith

== Alliances ==
- United Kingdom - The Queen's Royal Hussars (The Queen's Own and Royal Irish)

== Battle honours ==
South Africa 1879, South Africa 1899–1902, Relief of Ladysmith, Natal 1906, South West Africa 1914–1915, Gibeon, Western Desert 1941–43

Battle Honours
Awarded to Umvoti Mounted Rifles
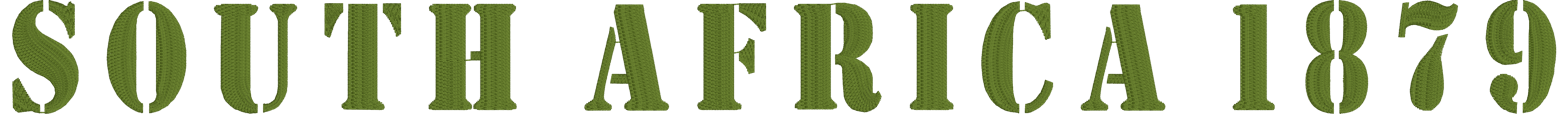
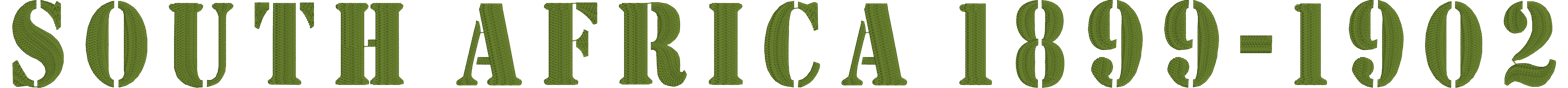
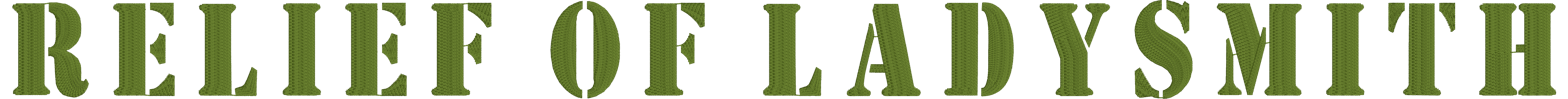
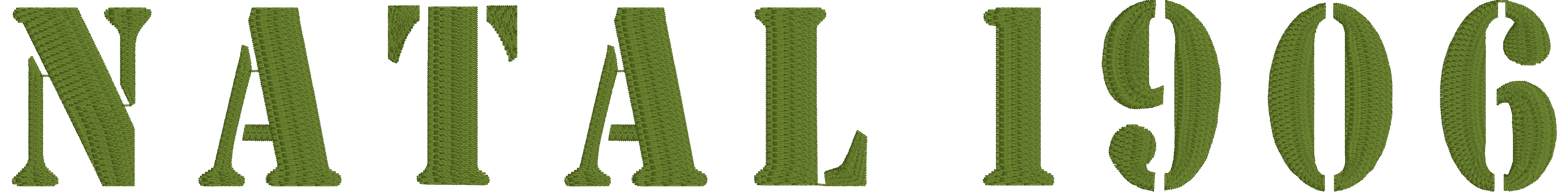
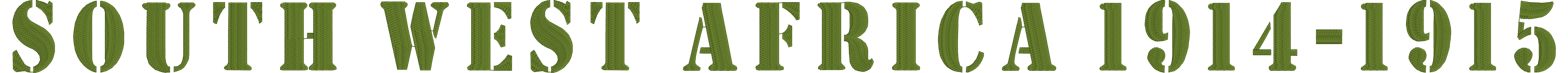
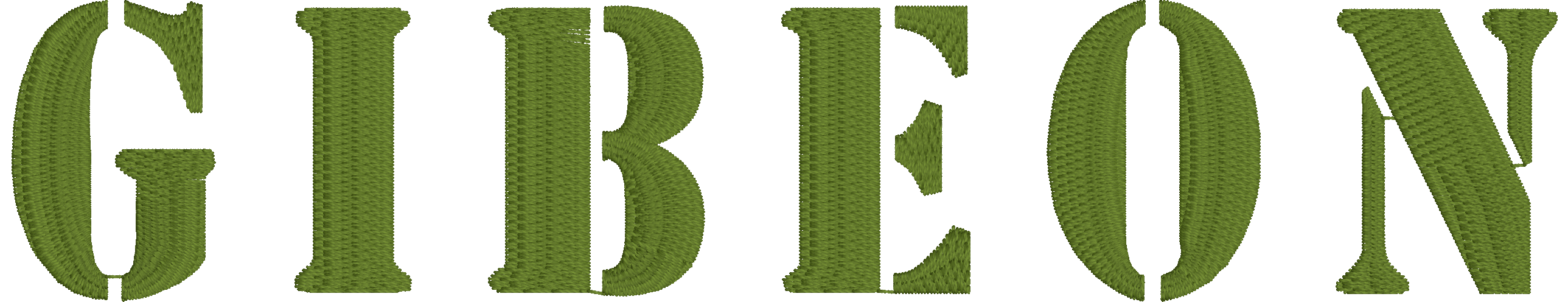
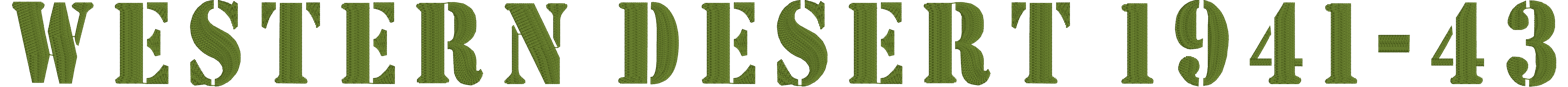

As virtually the whole Regiment was captured at Tobruk in June 1942, there were no more World War II battle honours.
