= Durban South Commando =

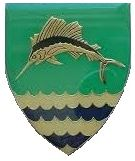
- Durban South Commando emblem
- Active: 1949-1994
- Country: South Africa
- Allegiance: Republic of South Africa; Republic of South Africa
- Branch: South African Army; South African Army
- Type: Infantry
- Role: Light Infantry
- Size: One Battalion
- Part of: South African Infantry Corps; Army Territorial Reserve
- Garrison/HQ: Durban

Durban South Commando was a light infantry regiment of the South African Army. It formed part of the South African Army Infantry Formation as well as the South African Territorial Reserve.

== History ==
=== Origins ===
==== Defunct Rifle Association ====
This unit originated from one of the defunct rifle associations established in 1949 and was re-designated a commando unit.

=== Operations ===
==== With the SADF ====
During the State of Emergency in the 1980s, this commando was tasked with protecting strategic facilities around Mobeni, Jacobs and Montclair. The unit was primarily tasked in quelling township riots.

The unit also sent modular platoons to South West Africa as well as patrolled the Northern Natal Border.

The unit resorted under the command of the SADF's Group 10 and shared the Monastery building in Montclair with Regiment Congella.

The unit received its colours on 29 June 1991.

==== With the SANDF ====
===== Amalgamation and Disbandment =====
This unit was amalgamated with the South Coast Commando in 1994.

The amalgamated unit along with all other Commando units was disbanded after a decision by South African President Thabo Mbeki to disband all Commando Units. The Commando system was phased out between 2003 and 2008 "because of the role it played in the apartheid era", according to the Minister of Safety and Security Charles Nqakula.

== Unit insignia ==
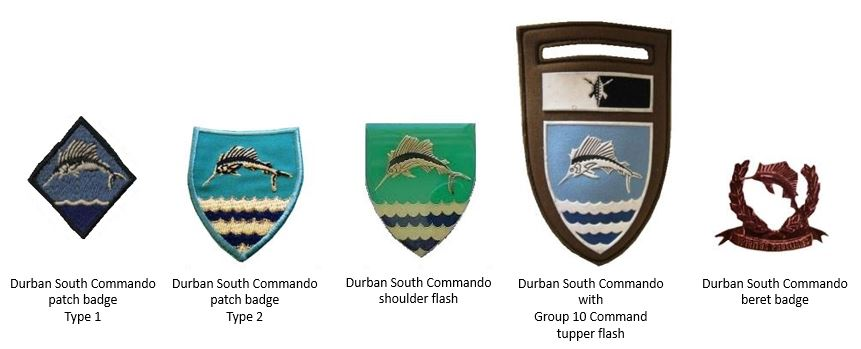
SADF era Durban South Commando insignia

== Leadership ==
Leadership
From	Honorary Colonels	To	Ribbon
	No known incumbents		
From	Commanding Officers	To	Ribbon
	No known incumbents		
From	Regimental Sergeants Major	To	Ribbon
	No known incumbents		

== See also ==
- South African Commando System
