= Durban North Commando =

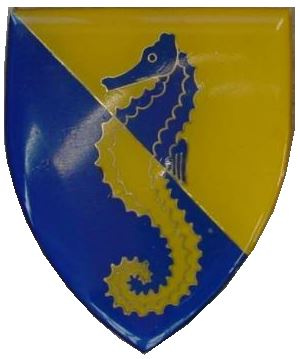
- Durban North Commando emblem
- Disbanded: 1994
- Country: South Africa
- Branch: South African Army
- Type: Infantry
- Role: Light infantry
- Size: One battalion
- Part of: South African Infantry Corps; Army Territorial Reserve
- Garrison/HQ: Durban North

Durban North Commando was a light infantry regiment of the South African Army. It formed part of the South African Army Infantry Formation as well as the South African Territorial Reserve.

== History ==
=== Operations ===
==== With the SADF ====
During the State of Emergency in the 1980s, this commando was tasked with protecting strategic facilities. The unit was primarily tasked in quelling township riots.

The unit resorted under the command of the SADF's Group 10.

==== First Indian officer in the Commandos ====
Vikram Singh of Tongaat became the first Indian officer in the commandos in 1984.

==== With the SANDF ====
===== Amalgamation and Disbandment =====
This unit was amalgamated with the Durban South Commando in 1994.

The amalgamated unit along with all other Commando units was disbanded after a decision by South African President Thabo Mbeki to disband all Commando Units. The Commando system was phased out between 2003 and 2008 "because of the role it played in the apartheid era", according to the Minister of Safety and Security Charles Nqakula.

== Unit Insignia ==
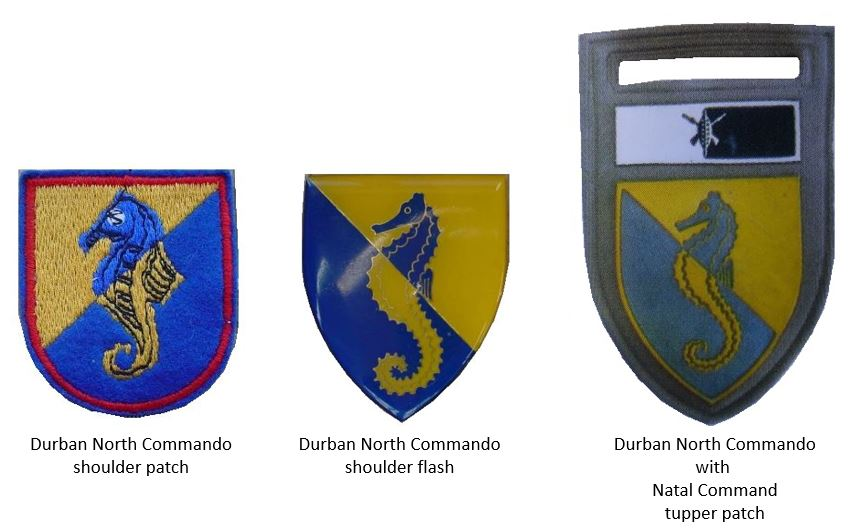
SADF era Durban North Commando insignia

== Leadership ==
Leadership
From	Honorary Colonels	To	Ribbon
	No known incumbents		
From	Commanding Officers	To	Ribbon
	No known incumbents		
From	Regimental Sergeants Major	To	Ribbon
	No known incumbents		

== See also ==
- South African Commando System
