= Umvoti Commando =

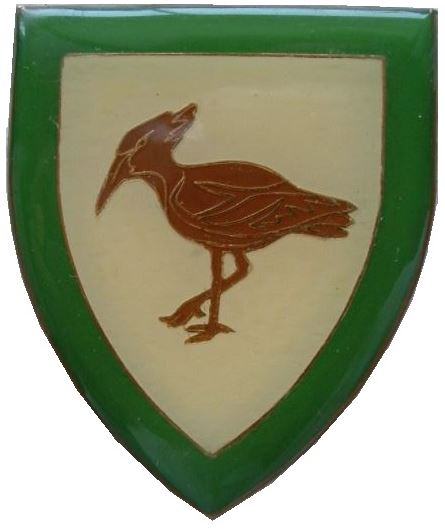
- Umvoti Commando emblem
- Active: 1952-
- Country: South Africa
- Allegiance: Republic of South Africa; Republic of South Africa
- Branch: South African Army; South African Army
- Type: Infantry
- Role: Light Infantry
- Size: One Battalion
- Part of: Natal Command Group 9
- Garrison/HQ: Greytown
- Motto(s): "Popula Nostro Servire" We serve our people

Umvoti Commando was a Commando unit of the South African Army. It formed part of the South African Army Infantry Formation as well as the South African Territorial Reserve.

== History ==
=== Origin ===
==== Rifle Association ====
The forerunner of Umvoti Commando was a unit raised in 1949 in the Greytown district as sub unit of the Zululand Skiet Kommando under command of Captain A.W. Rossouw.

=== Operations ===
==== With the UDF ====
Umvoti Commando was named on 5 August 1952 after a requirement to split from the Zululand Skiet Kommando was approved.

==== With the SADF ====
The unit was stationed in Greytown since its beginning and moved to a purpose built HQ in 1978.

===== Area of responsibility =====
The unit was responsible for Umvoti, Kranskop, New Hannover and Msinga magisterial districts.

===== National Colours =====
The unit was awarded its National Colours on 29 June 1991.

==== With the SANDF ====
===== Disbandment =====
This unit, along with all other Commando units was disbanded after a decision by South African President Thabo Mbeki to disband all Commando Units. The Commando system was phased out between 2003 and 2008 "because of the role it played in the apartheid era", according to the Minister of Safety and Security Charles Nqakula.

== Unit Insignia ==
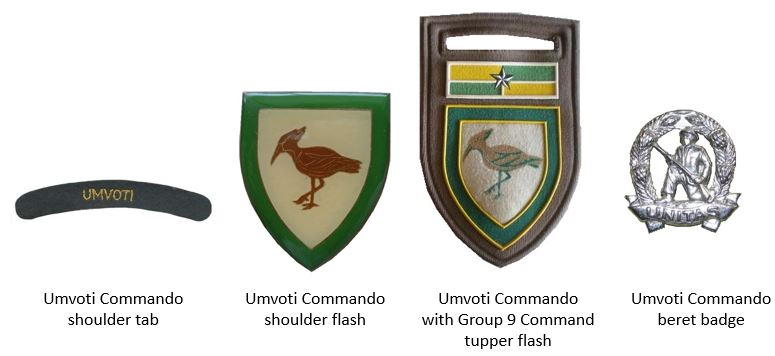
SADF era Umvoti Commando insignia

== Leadership ==
- Cmdt J.F. van Rooyen 1952-1963
- Cmdt W.G. Redinger 1963-1966
- Cmdt K. du Preez 1966-1967
- Cmdt J. van Rooyen 1967-1969
- Cmdt J Menne 1969-1971
- Cmdt W.G. Redinger 1971-1978
- Cmdt G.E. Lauterbach 1978-1988
- Cmdt W.W. Fourie 1988-
