= Oribi Commando =

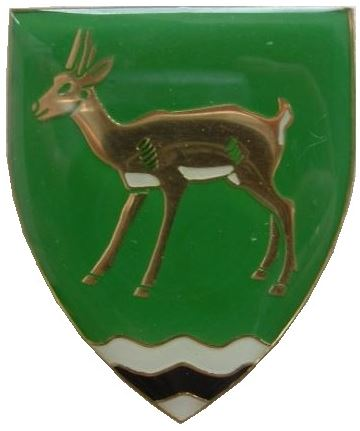
- Oribi Commando shoulder flash
- Disbanded: c. 2003
- Country: South Africa
- Allegiance: Republic of South Africa; Republic of South Africa
- Branch: South African Army; South African Army
- Type: Infantry
- Role: Light Infantry
- Size: Battalion
- Part of: South African Infantry Corps; Army Territorial Reserve
- Garrison/HQ: Port Shepstone

Oribi Commando was a light infantry regiment of the South African Army. It formed part of the South African Army Infantry Formation as well as the South African Territorial Reserve.

== History ==
=== Origins ===
Oribi commando was raised in 1979 and took responsibility for the area originally allocated to Charlie Company of South Coast Commando.

==== With the SADF ====
This area stretched from Karridene to Port Edward and inland to the Highflats area. Its headquarters was originally based at Winkelspruit.

A new headquarters in Marburg, Port Shepstone was occupied in 1980.

The commando consisted of the following:

- Alpha company: essentially national servicemen who formed the reaction unit
- Bravo company: volunteers from Umkomaas and Scottburgh
- Charlie company: volunteers from Hibberdene, Port Shepstone and Paddock
- Delta company: volunteers from Shell Beach, Margate and Port Edward

===== Reaction Force =====
This commando was home to a full-time reaction force for the southern part of natal and as a result the commando was essentially deployed on an ongoing basis during the period of unrest.

===== National Colours =====
This unit received its national Colours on 11 August 1990.

==== With the SANDF ====
===== Disbandment =====
This unit, along with all other Commando units was disbanded after a decision by South African President Thabo Mbeki to disband all Commando Units. The Commando system was phased out between 2003 and 2008 "because of the role it played in the apartheid era", according to the Minister of Safety and Security Charles Nqakula.

== Unit Insignia ==
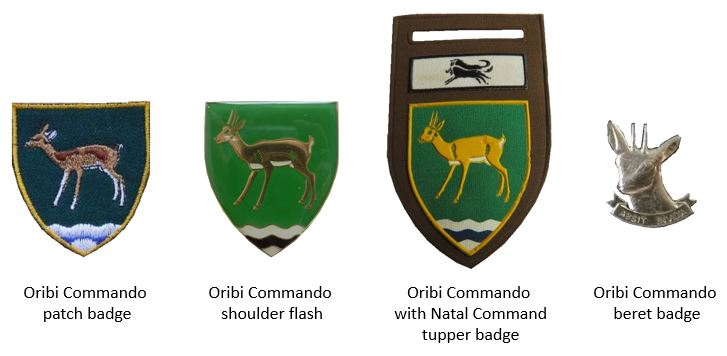
SADF era Oribi Commando insignia

== Leadership ==
Leadership
From	Commanding Officers	To	Ribbon
1979	Maj J.J Gerber	1980	
1980	Cmdt L. Palmer	1991	
1991	Cmdt A.R. Lotter	1993	
1993	Lt Col C.J.M. Stoltz	nd	
From	Regimental Sergeants Major	To	Ribbon
1979	WO2 R. Frampton MMM,JCD	1982	Military Merit Medal MMM John Chard Decoration JCD
1982	WO2 R.E. Johnson MMM,JCD	1987	Military Merit Medal MMM John Chard Decoration JCD
1987	WO2 J.G.K. Louw MMM,JCD	1987	Military Merit Medal MMM John Chard Decoration JCD
1987	WO2 P.A.J. Griffith MMM,JCD	nd	Military Merit Medal MMM John Chard Decoration JCD

== See also ==
- South African Commando System
