= Nick Bierman =

South African military commander (1910–1977)

Lieutenant General Jacobus Nicolas Bierman SSA SM CBE
- Born: 13 February 1910; Potchefstroom, South Africa
- Died: 8 June 1977 (aged 67); Potchefstroom, South Africa
- Military career
- Allegiance: South Africa
- Branch: South African Army
- Service years: 1934–1967
- Rank: Lieutenant General
- Service number: 105970V
- Commands: Army Chief of Staff; Inspector-General; GOC Joint Combat Forces
- Wars: WWII
- Awards

Lieutenant-General Jacobus Nicolas Bierman SSA SM CBE (1910–1977) was a South African military commander. He played one Rugby Test Match for the Springbok team in 1931

== Military career ==
He joined the South African Army in 1934. During World War II he served in North Africa, and commanded the artillery of the South African 6th Armoured Division in Italy.

He served as Army Chief of Staff from 1958 to 1959, as Inspector-General from 1959 to 1960, as Director of Planning and Operations from 1960 to 1965, and as General Officer Commanding Joint Combat Forces (GOCJCF), co-ordinating Army and Air Force operations and training, from 1965 to 1967. As GOCJCF, he was the third-highest-ranking officer in the South African Defence Force's Supreme Command.

== Awards and decorations ==
In 1945 then Brigadier Bierman was made Commander of the Order of the British Empire. The notice in the London Gazette reads as follows:

The KING has been graciously pleased to give orders for the following promotions in, and appointments to, the Most Excellent Order of the British Empire, in recognition of gallant and distinguished services in Italy:
To be Additional Commanders of the Military Division of the said Most Excellent Order:
Brigadier (temporary) Jacobus Nicolas Bierman (105970V), South African Forces.

He was also awarded the Bronze Star

- Star of South Africa (1952) (SSA)
- Southern Cross Medal (1952) (SM)
- Order of the British Empire (Commander) (CBE)
- Bronze Star Medal
- Union Medal
- 1939–45 Star
- Africa Star
- Italy Star
- Defence Medal (United Kingdom)
- War Medal 1939–1945
- Africa Service Medal (WWII)

== See also ==
- List of South African military chiefs
- South African Army
- South African Defence Force

Military offices
Preceded by Pieter Grobbelaar	Chief of the South African Army; 1958–1959	Succeeded by Sybrand Engelbrecht
Preceded by Brig Jock B. Kriegler	OC Western Transvaal Command; 1950–1953	Succeeded by Col Gustav Nauhaus
Preceded by Lt Col Frank Harpur	OC 4 Field Regiment; 1945–1947	Succeeded by Lt Col Bull Jacobs
