= Midland Commando =

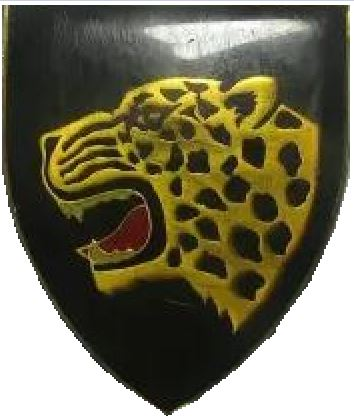
- Midland Commando emblem
- Active: 1962-
- Country: South Africa
- Allegiance: Republic of South Africa; Republic of South Africa
- Branch: South African Army; South African Army
- Type: Infantry
- Role: Light Infantry
- Size: One Battalion
- Part of: South African Infantry Corps; Army Territorial Reserve, initially Group 7, Finally Group 6
- Garrison/HQ: Grahamstown
- Motto(s): "Malis noli cedere" Never give up

Midland Commando was a light infantry regiment of the South African Army. It formed part of the South African Army Infantry Formation as well as the South African Territorial Reserve.

== History ==
=== Origin ===
This unit was originally named Fort Beaufort Commando.

=== Operations ===
==== With the SADF ====
The unit was renamed in 1962. The unit was located in Grahamstown.

The area covered by this unit included Alexandria, Albany, Bathurst, Craddock, Fort Beaufort, Keiskammahoek, Pearston, Peddie and Somerset East.

By 1968 the area of the Midland Commando was reduced to the magisterial district of Albany, Alexandria and Bathurst.

During this era, the unit was mainly used for area force protection, search and cordones as well as stock theft control assistance to the local police.

===== Association with the Winterberg Commando =====
The Winterberg Commando was founded in Adelaide in 1948. That units area of responsibility was significantly large on the outset, and two further commandos namely Katberg and Midland Commandos were developed.

==== With the SANDF ====
===== Disbandment =====
This unit, along with all other Commando units was disbanded after a decision by South African President Thabo Mbeki to disband all Commando Units. The Commando system was phased out between 2003 and 2008 "because of the role it played in the apartheid era", according to the Minister of Safety and Security Charles Nqakula.

== Unit Insignia ==
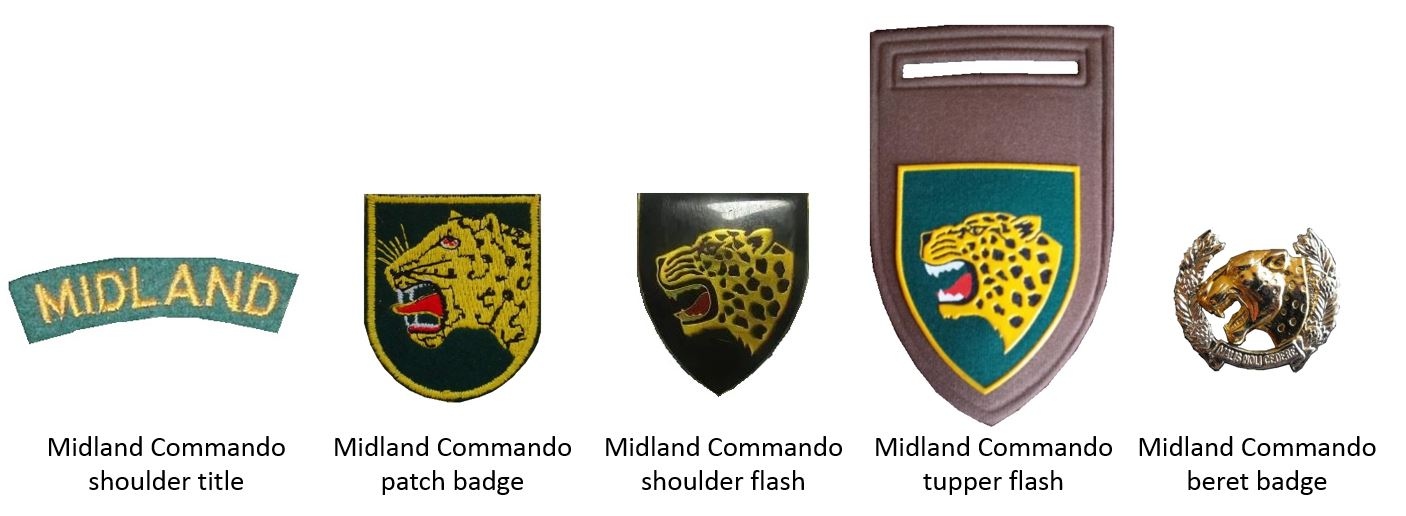
SADF era Midland Commando insignia

== See also ==
- South African Commando System
