= Umkomaas Commando =

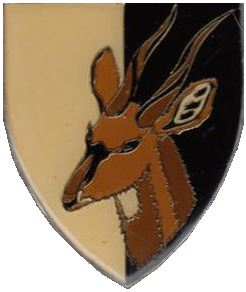
- Umkomaas Commando emblem
- Active: 1963-
- Country: South Africa
- Allegiance: Republic of South Africa; Republic of South Africa
- Branch: South African Army; South African Army
- Type: Infantry
- Role: Light Infantry
- Size: One Battalion
- Part of: South African Infantry Corps; Army Territorial Reserve, Group 9
- Garrison/HQ: Richmond, Pietermaritzburg

Umkomaas Commando was a light infantry regiment of the South African Army. It formed part of the South African Army Infantry Formation as well as the South African Territorial Reserve.

== History ==
=== Origin ===
Umkomaas Commando was activated when it inherited the urban members of the Pietermaritzburg Rifle Commando in 1963.

=== Operations ===
==== With the SADF ====
Initially, the Umkomaas Commando was headquartered in Ixopo under Kmdt J.R.Guy. It consisted of 3 companies with A Company being based at the Drill Hall in Pietermaritzburg, B Company based in Eston-Mid Illovo and C Company based in Ixopo.

Umkomaas Commando shared close affinity with Natalia Regiment. Its original HQ (post 1989) was in Richmond where it shared accommodation with Group 9 in the Old Gaol Building.

The unit was later transferred to Pietermaritzburg and allocated its own HQ in the Oribi Village.

By July 1981 the unit moved back to Richmond, but by 1991 it had returned to the Oribi Village in Pietermaritzburg.

===== Training and Operations =====
The unit held annual training camps and maintained a rifle shooting range on the farm Dawn Valley near Ixopo from 1963 to 1968, and near Shongweni and Hammarsdal from 1969 to 1975. From 1976 the unit deployed a company to South West Africa for border duty.

===== Areas of Responsibility =====
Umkomaas Commando provided quick reaction patrols in support of the South African Police during unrest in the Natal Midlands. By 1979 the units area of responsibility had changed and new borders set.

A new concept was established in the early 1980s and Industrial platoons were raised. Two of these now existed in the units original area of responsibility: at the Huletts Aluminium factory and the Pietermaritzburg Municipality.

===== National Colours =====
Umkomaas Commando was given its National Colours in June 1991.

==== With the SANDF ====
===== Disbandment =====
This unit, along with all other Commando units was disbanded after a decision by South African President Thabo Mbeki to disband all Commando Units. The Commando system was phased out between 2003 and 2008 "because of the role it played in the apartheid era", according to the Minister of Safety and Security Charles Nqakula.

== Unit Insignia ==
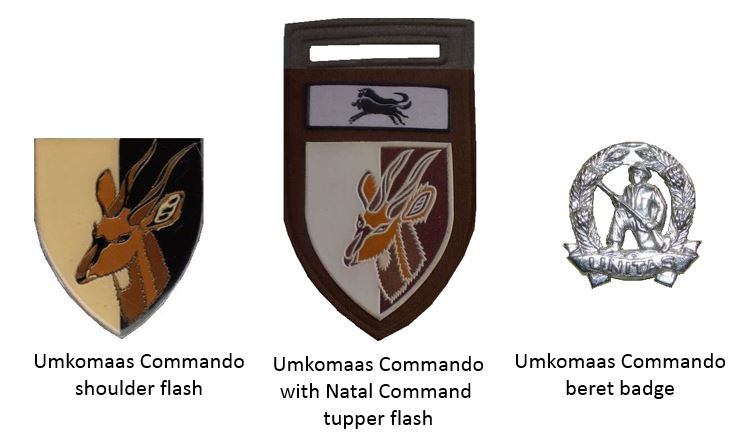
SADF era Umkomaas Commando insignia

== Leadership ==
- Cmdt J. Guy 1963-1969
- Cmdt G.A. Bowles 1969-1977
- Cmdt I. Deetlefs 1977-1981
- Cmdt E.B. Herbert 1981-1986
- Cmdt J.E. Butler 1986-1989
- Cmdt M.T. Staniland 1987-1991
- Lt Col F.C. McHattie 1992-

== See also ==
- South African Commando System
