= Jimmy Durrant =

South African pilot

Major General James Thom Durrant CB DFC
- Brigadier JT Durrant CB DFC SAAF
- Born: 5 May 1913
- Died: 15 October 1990 (aged 77); Parktown North, Johannesburg
- Relatives: Margaret Durrant () Two sons, a stepson and stepdaughter
- Military career
- Allegiance: South Africa
- Branch: South African Air Force
- Service years: 1933–1952
- Rank: Major General
- Nickname: Jimmy
- Commands: 3 SAAF Wing; No. 205 Group RAF; No. 231 Heavy Bomber Group, RAF; Director-General SAAF
- Awards: Order of the Bath CB Distinguished Flying Cross (United Kingdom) DFC 1939–45 Star Africa Star Italy Star War Medal 1939 – 1945 MID Africa Service Medal (WWII) Legion of Merit LOM
- Other work: Businessman; Johannesburg City Councillor; Museum Trustee

Major General James Thom Durrant CB DFC (1913 – 15 October 1990) was a highly successful South African pilot during World War II who eventually became the Director-General of the South African Air Force. In addition to commanding SAAF squadrons and wings, he also commanded RAF bomber groups. At the age of 32, he was the youngest Major-General in the Allied forces. He resigned from the SAAF as a result of the de-anglicisation policy instituted by Frans Erasmus of the National Party after they took power after the 1948 general election.

== Early life ==
James Thom Durrant was born in Johannesburg and educated at St John's College.

== Military career ==
He joined the South African Air Force Reserve at the age of 19. In 1933–34, he successfully completed a Permanent Force Cadet Course, whereafter he served in the South African Air Force and qualified as a pilot. He passed a special course at the RAF Photographic School at RAF Farnborough, the school which TE Lawrence had attended in 1922.

He returned to the Union, where he did aerial survey work. He was commissioned as a 2nd lieutenant in November 1934.

He held several posts between this period and the outbreak of war and proved himself to be a most capable flying instructor. In 1936, he was promoted lieutenant and in 1937 flight commander. In 1938, he was promoted captain and posted to Waterkloof Air Station.

With the outbreak of World War II he was appointed officer commanding, Photo Flight, with the rank of major and later officer commanding of No. 40 Squadron SAAF which he commanded in East Africa from May 1940 – September 1941 when he was promoted lieutenant-colonel and appointed officer commanding 24 Squadron SAAF. He commanded this squadron throughout the bitter fighting in the Western Desert Campaign in 1941–42.

He was then promoted colonel and given command of 3 (Bomber) Wing SAAF in North Africa, Sicily and Italy.

On 3 August 1944, he was seconded to RAF Bomber Command and placed in command of No. 205 Group RAF with the rank of brigadier. He was succeeded in the command of 205 Group by Air vice-marshal S.E. Toomer.

In 1945, he was posted to the Far East as AOC No. 231 Heavy Bomber Group, RAF, with the rank of major-general. At the age of 32, he was the youngest major general in the Allied forces.

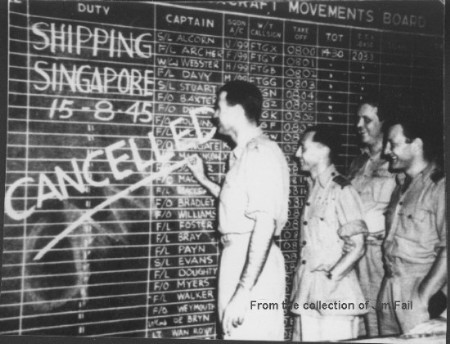
Last World War II bombing raid by 99, 356 and 321 Squadrons cancelled on 15 August 1945 by Maj-Genl JT Durrant SA Air Force

In 1946, he became director-general of the South African Air Force and qualified on a special course at the Imperial Defence College in 1951.

== Warsaw uprising ==
At 17:00 in Warsaw on 1 August 1944, General Bor-Komorowski ordered the Home Army to rise against the Germans. The element of surprise aided the AK, who after 5 days had captured 70% of Warsaw. Because the promised Russian intervention never materialised, the well-armed Germans received reinforcements and gradually stemmed and turned the tide. Food and ammunition ran low but not so much as a reply to the Poles' call for help was received by the AK. Furthermore, Stalin flatly refused landing permission to UK based planes behind Russian lines.

Warsaw was about 910 mi (1,460 km) from the UK on the great circle course, but in order to avoid the defences of the Reich a detour would be near to 1100, and a return journey of 2,200 mi (3,500 km) was out of the question. Churchill then ordered that relief be flown to Warsaw from Italy which is a little closer, some 815 mi (1,312 km) on the great circle thus requiring a return journey of almost 2,000 mi (3,200 km). This would have led right over heavily defended points but was the most realistic compromise.

Major-General Durrant went to see Air Vice Marshal John Slessor and was surprised to be admitted to the presence of Churchill himself in an adjoining office. He pointed out to Churchill that an airlift of 1,000 mi (1,600 km), most of it over enemy territory, could hold no hope of military success, and that the loss of airmen and aircraft would be tremendous. Churchill's reply was brief and to the point:

From a military point of view you are right, but from a political point of view you must carry on. Good Morning.

And so Durrant and his volunteer aircrews, accepting all the known risks, made 196 trips to Warsaw, which included 11 hours over the Carpathian Mountains, and then flying at rooftop height to drop canisters packed with guns, ammunition and food.

Of the 80 aircraft that participated, 31 were shot down, 17 of which over the weekend of 13–16 August.

== Resignation ==
He resigned from the South African Air Force on 29 February 1952 citing "irreconcilable differences with the Minister of Defence".

He stated that, despite Ministerial Frans Erasmus's assurances that there were no politics in the UDF, a senior officer on his own staff had said to the Chief of the General Staff (at that time Lt-Genl Christiaan du Toit) in his presence: "I want you to understand that I am 100 percent Nationalist, and that anything I am reputed to have said or done has been in the interests of my Minister." When Brigadier Durrant had objected to this statement, the Chief of the General Staff ruled that such a declaration of politics could be made if so desired.

== Honours and awards ==
It was for his participation in the Abyssinian campaign that he gained the DFC.

He was created a Companion of the Order of the Bath, CB.

In August 1946, Air Chief Marshal Sir Keith Park GCB KBE MC DFC, Allied Air Commander-in-Chief, South East Asia included the following in his report, Air Operations in South East Asia 3 May 1945 to 12 September 1945, to the Secretary of State for Air commenting on the successful sinking of a 10 000 ton Japanese tanker by the air forces of 231 Group:

For this outstanding success I sent a message of congratulation to Major-General JT Durrant, SAAF, who, on June 15th, had assumed Command of 231 Group.

In 1994, the Polish Ambassador to South Africa, Mr S Cieniuch presented the Warsaw Insurrectionary Cross to Durrant's widow.

He was also awarded the American Legion of Merit.

- Order of the Bath (Companion) (CB)
- Distinguished Flying Cross (United Kingdom) (DFC)
- 1939–45 Star
- Africa Star
- Italy Star
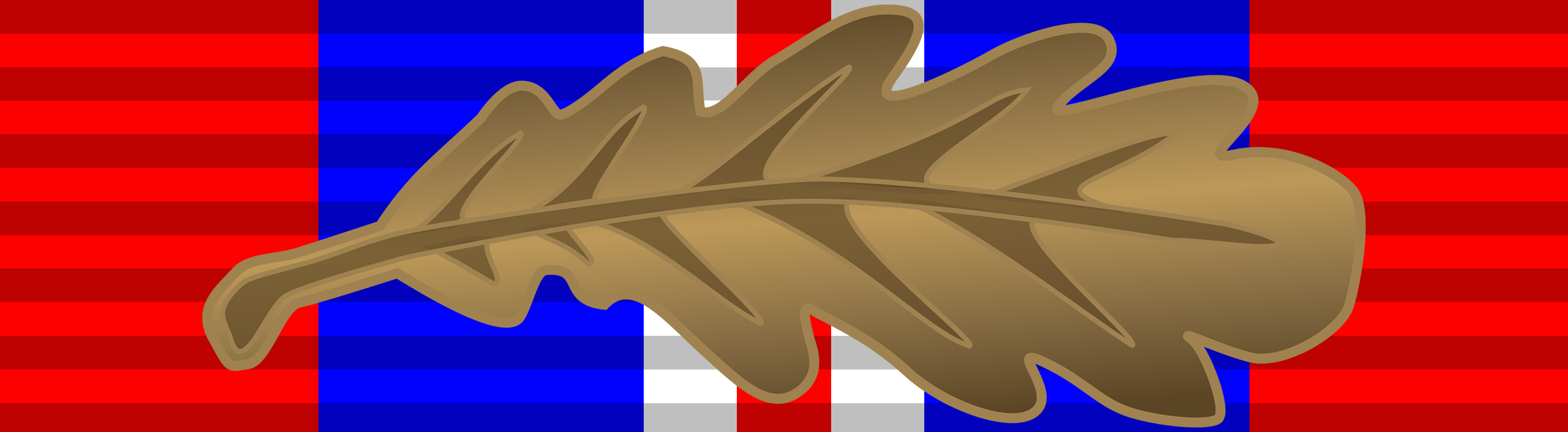
- War Medal 1939 – 1945 (Mentioned in Dispatches) (MID)
- Africa Service Medal (WWII)
- Legion of Merit (Commander) (LOM) (USA)
- Warsaw Uprising Cross

== Other roles ==
He served as a trustee of the South African National War Museum from October 1946 – December 1950.

Upon leaving the Air Force, he made his mark in the commercial and business world.

He was elected as a Councillor in the Johannesburg City Council. and served on the council from 1969–1977. In 1970, he was appointed to the board of trustees of the South African National War Museum as one of the Johannesburg City Council representatives.

Brigadier Durrant had a deep-rooted regard for all matters military. In this regard, he was extremely active as a member of the War Histories Advisory Committee responsible for the writing of the series of histories recording the part played by the South African forces during World War II. Two volumes in this series were published.

== Death ==
He died at his home in Parktown North, Johannesburg, after a short illness, on 15 October 1990 aged 77. He was buried with full military honours from the Parktown Presbyterian Church on 19 October.

He was survived by his wife, Margaret, two sons and a stepson and stepdaughter.

Military offices
Preceded by John Simpson	Air Officer Commanding No. 205 (Bomber) Group RAF; 4 August 1944–1944	Succeeded by S.E. Toomer
Preceded by Harold Willmott	Director-General of the South African Air Force; 1946–1952	Succeeded by Harold Willmott
