= Drakensberg Commando =

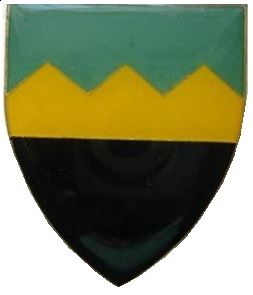
- Drakensberg Commando emblem
- Founded: 1961 (65 years ago)
- Disbanded: February 14, 2023 (3 years ago)
- Country: South Africa
- Allegiance: Republic of South Africa; Republic of South Africa
- Branch: South African Army; South African Army
- Type: Infantry
- Role: Light Infantry
- Size: One Battalion
- Part of: South African Infantry Corps; Army Territorial Reserve, Group 11 and Group 27
- Garrison/HQ: Newcastle

Drakensberg Commando was a light infantry regiment of the South African Army. It formed part of the South African Army Infantry Formation as well as the South African Territorial Reserve.

== History ==
=== Origins ===
The Drakensberg Commando was raised in 1961 in Newcastle as a company of the Dundee Commando.

=== Operations ===
==== With the SADF ====
The unit became a fully fledged unit by August 1964.

The unit was fell initially under the command of Group 11 until that Group HQ was disbanded and then resorted under command of Group 27 in Eshowe.

A company of this unit did border duty in South West Africa in 1976.

The units also saw duty in the internal unrest of northern Natal.

==== With the SANDF ====
===== Disbandment =====
This unit, along with all other Commando units was disbanded after a decision by South African President Thabo Mbeki to disband all Commando Units. The Commando system was phased out between 2003 and 2008 "because of the role it played in the apartheid era", according to the Minister of Safety and Security Charles Nqakula.

== Unit Insignia ==
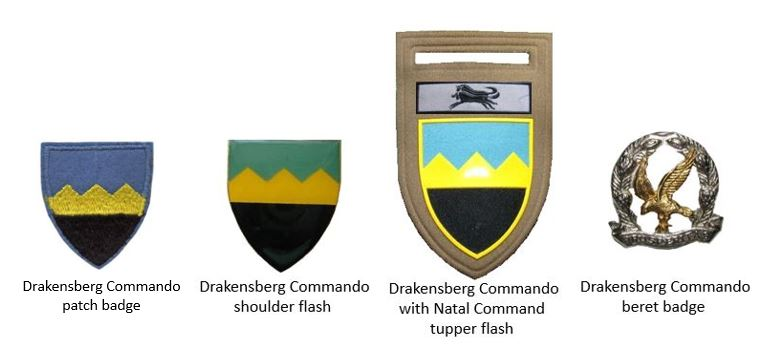
SADF era Drakensberg Commando insignia

== Leadership ==
Leadership
From	Honorary Colonels	To	Ribbon
	No known incumbents		
From	Commanding Officers	To	Ribbon
	No known incumbents		
From	Regimental Sergeants Major	To	Ribbon
	No known incumbents		

== See also ==
- South African Commando System
