= King Cetshwayo Artillery Regiment =

Artillery regiment of the South African Army

Natal Field Artillery King Cetshwayo Artillery Regiment
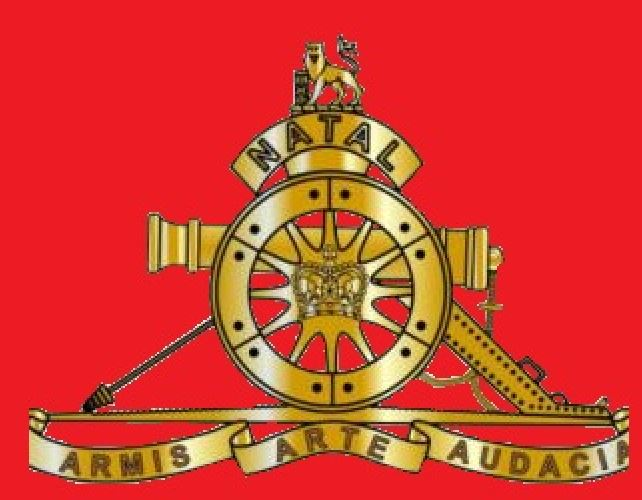
- SANDF Natal Field Artillery emblem
- Active: September 1862 to present
- Country: South Africa
- Allegiance: Republic of South Africa; Republic of South Africa
- Branch: South African Army; South African Army
- Type: Reserve artillery
- Role: Medium (self propelled) Artillery (G6)
- Part of: South African Army Artillery Formation; Army Conventional Reserve
- Garrison/HQ: Lord's Grounds, Durban 29°51′02″S 31°1′22″E
- Mottos: Armis Arte Audacia (With Arms, Skill and Bravery)
- Equipment: GV6 155 mm self-propelled howitzer
- Engagements: Second Anglo-Boer War; World War I World War II; South African Border War
- Battle honours: South West Africa 1915

Commanders
- Current commander: Major Craig Nel

Insignia
- Collar Badge: Bursting grenade with seven flames
- Beret Colour: Oxford Blue
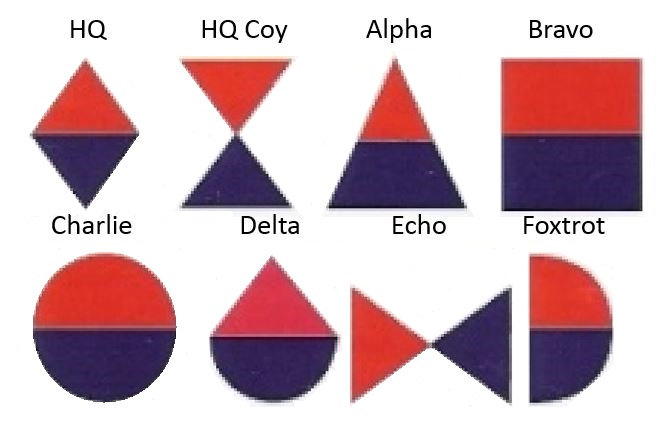
- Artillery Battery Emblems

- Artillery Beret Bar circa 1992
- Abbreviation: KCAR

The King Cetshwayo Artillery Regiment (formerly the Natal Field Artillery) is a reserve artillery regiment of the South African Army.

== History ==
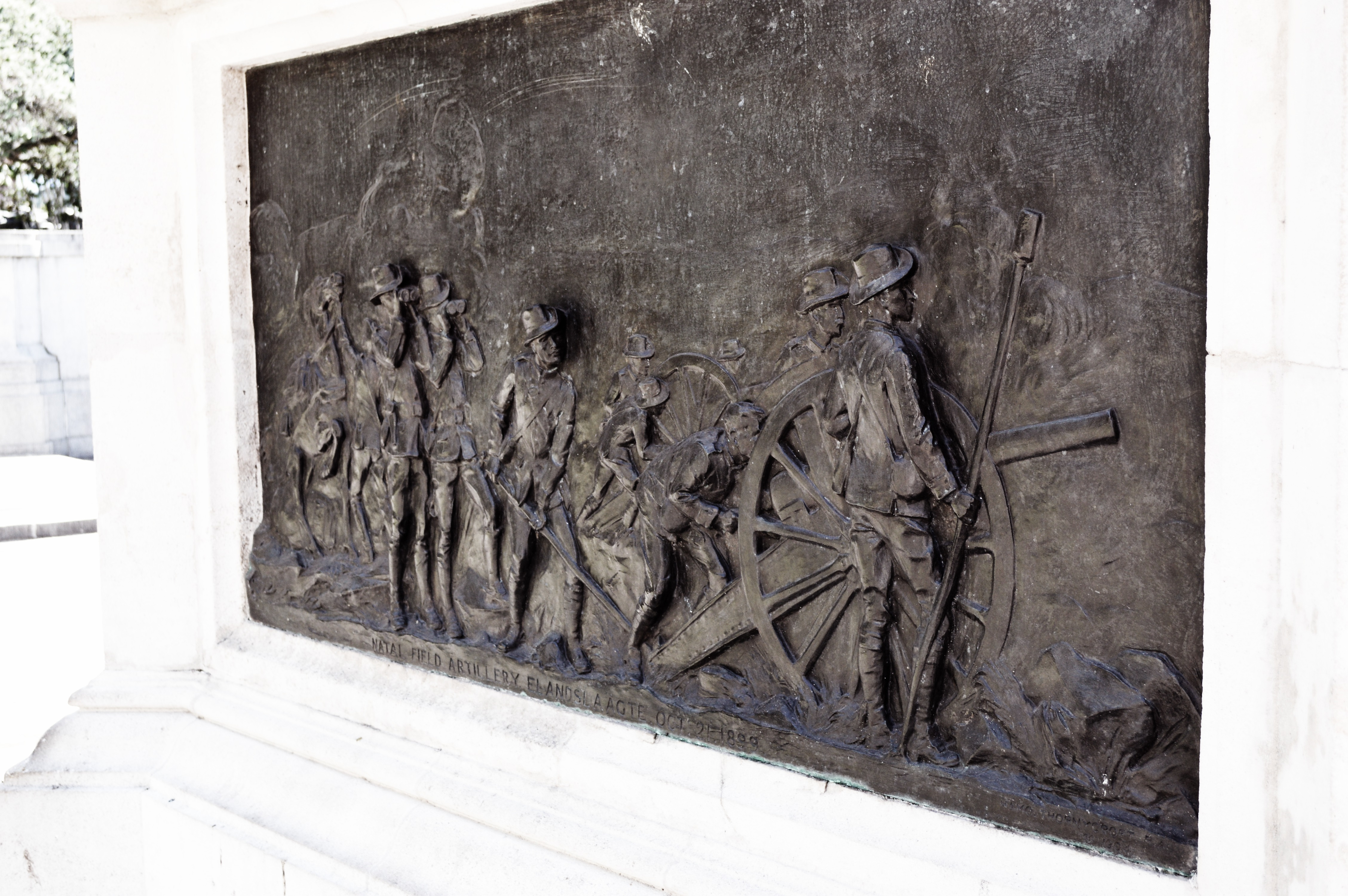
Memorial plaque commemorating the regiment's participation in the Battle of Elandslaagte

The Natal Field Artillery was raised in 1862 as part of the Durban Volunteer Guard, and later became a unit in its own right.

The regiment took part in the Second Anglo-Boer War and the South African invasion of German South-West Africa during the First World War.

Although artillery units in the South African Army do not usually receive battle honours, the NFA was awarded the honour "South-West Africa 1915."

During the Second World War, the regiment formed part of the 2nd South African Division and was captured during the fall of Tobruk, part of the Western Desert campaign in North Africa fighting Erwin Rommel's Afrika Korps. This occurred in a series of engagements called the Battle of Gazala. One of these engagements was Rommel's attack against Allied forces near Tobruk was on 13 June 1942. The 21st Panzer Division attacked South African positions on Rigel Ridge in the middle of a sandstorm. This was the 6th South African Anti-tank battery of the 2nd field regiment. The South African gunners kept firing until all their guns were destroyed, allowing the withdrawal of other Allied formations. The guns were commanded individually and fired at the Panzers over open sights. The German tanks took up positions behind the ridge with anti-tank guns placed between them. The Germans put down a devastating fire onto the South African positions. One of the columns of Panzers attacked them from the rear, surrounding them and cutting off all escape. Nevertheless, the gunners kept firing until all eight guns had been destroyed. About half the gun detachments were killed and wounded, including the battery commander and many officers. When the battery had been silenced, the enemy tanks approached cautiously and the South African gunners were made prisoners. The entire Natal Field Artillery Regiment was captured and would not be re-formed until after the war. On that day the Germans captured over 3,000 Allied prisoners.

After the Second World War, the regiment eventually became attached to the 84 Motorised Brigade of the 8th South African Armoured Division.

=== Other names ===
From 1913 to 1926, the NFA was designated the 7th Citizen Battery (NFA). From 1926 to 1932, it was the 2nd Citizen Battery (NFA). During the Second World War, it was the 2nd Field Regiment (NFA).

From 1960 to 1968, the regiment was affiliated to the University of Natal and was called the Natal University Regiment.

In August 2019, 52 Reserve Force units had their names changed to reflect the diverse military history of South Africa. The Natal Field Artillery became the King Cetshwayo Artillery Regiment, and have 3 years to design and implement new regimental insignia.

== Leadership ==
Leadership
From	Honorary Colonel	To	Ribbon
	No known incumbents		
From	Commanding Officer	To	Ribbon
1981	Cmdt R. Lovell-Greene MMM,JCD	1989	Military Merit Medal MMM John Chard Decoration JCD
n.d.	Maj Craig Nel	Present	
From	Regimental Sergeants Major	To	Ribbon
n.d.	MWO James Rumble	Present	

== Regimental insignia ==
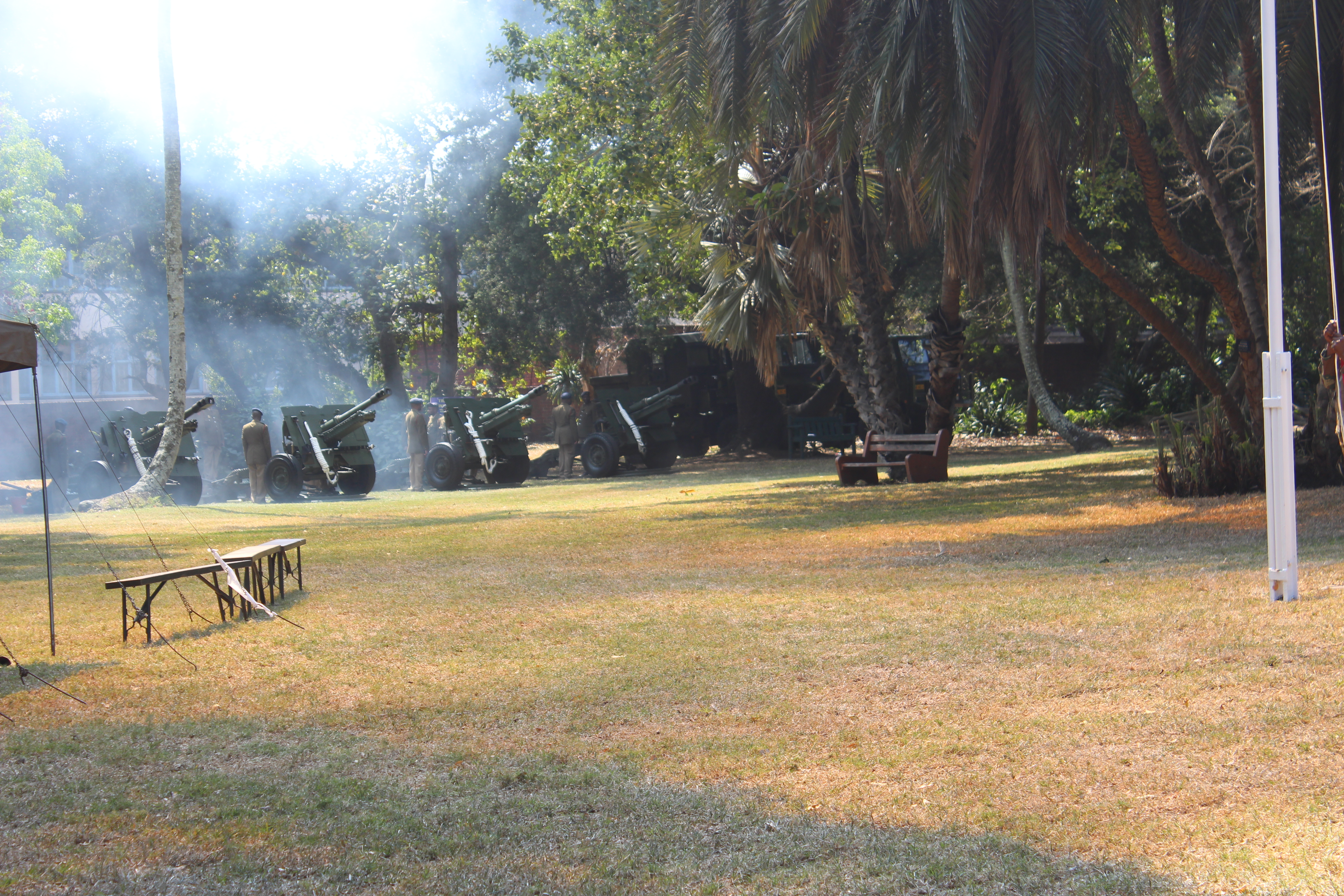
The NFA just after firing the salute at the Gunner's Memorial Service in Durban 2014

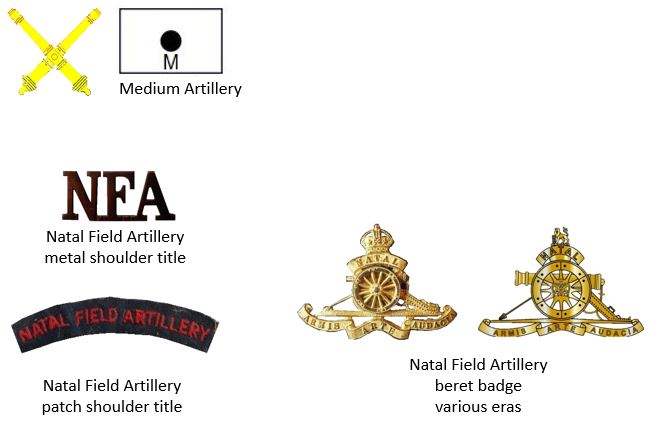
SADF era Natal Field Artillery insignia

Battle Honours
Awarded
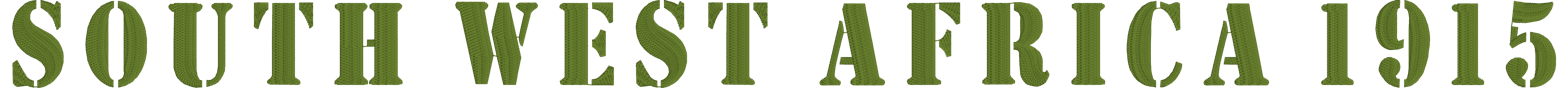

== Freedom of the City ==
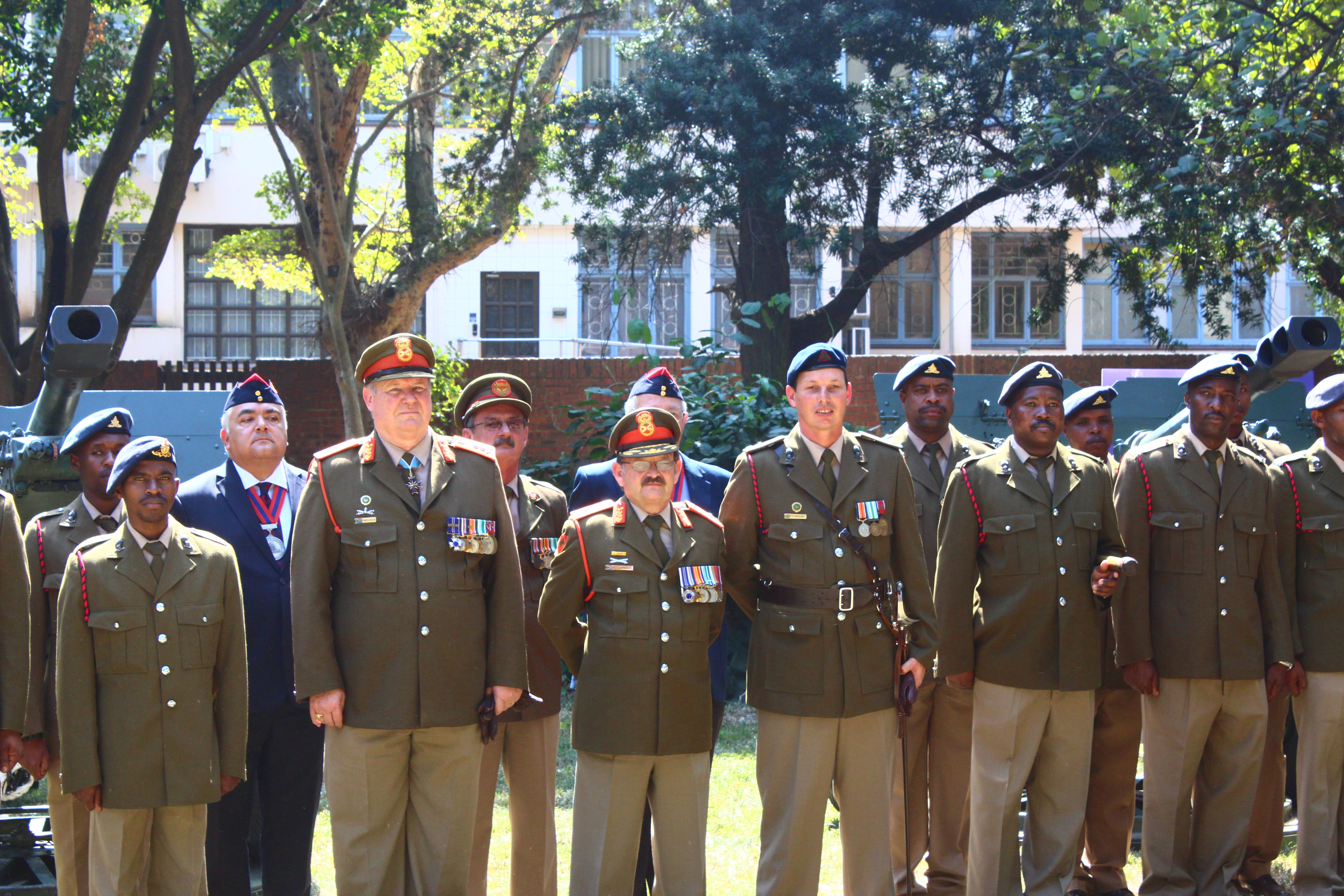
The NFA just after firing the salute at the Gunner's Memorial Service in Durban 2014

The regiment was awarded the Freedom of Durban on 28 September 1962, the Freedom of Pietermaritzburg on 29 September 1962 and the Freedom of eMnambithi / Ladysmith on 2 July 2011.
