= Harold Willmott =

South African military commander

Brigadier Harold George Wilmott CBE
- Born: 26 August 1899; Malmesbury, Cape Colony (now Western Cape)
- Died: 14 July 1993 (aged 93); Rondebosch, Cape Province, South Africa
- Military career
- Allegiance: South Africa
- Branch: South African Air Force
- Service years: 1924–1954
- Rank: Brigadier
- Awards: Order of the British Empire CBE

Brigadier Harold Willmott CBE (1899 – 1993) was a South African military commander.

== Military career ==
He served in the Royal Air Force in World War I, and joined the South African Air Force in 1924.

During World War II, he served as Deputy Director-General of Air Services from 1939 to 1940, as commander of 3 Wing in North Africa from 1941 to 1942, as Director of the Coastal Air Force from 1942 to 1944, and as Deputy Director-General of the Air Force from 1944 to 1945, when he was promoted to Director-General.

After the war, he served as Officer Commanding Natal Command, and finally as Air Chief of Staff, from 17 October 1945 to 10 September 1946.

== Honours and awards ==
He was appointed Commander of the Most Excellent Order of the British Empire in the January 1943 New Year Honours list.

- Order of the British Empire (Commander) (CBE)

== See also ==
- List of South African military chiefs
- South African Air Force

Military offices
New title	Chief of Staff of the South African Air Force; 1951–1954	Succeeded by Stephen Melville
Preceded by Jimmy Durrant	Director-General of the South African Air Force; 1942–1951	Title changed
Preceded by Christoffel Venter	Director-General of the South African Air Force; 1945–1946	Succeeded by Jimmy Durrant
