= Brian Galgut =

The Honourable Brian Galgut SC

Deputy Judge President of the KwaZulu-Natal High Court
- In office 2001–2004

Judge of the Natal Provincial Division of the Supreme Court
- In office 1985–2001

Personal details
- Born: 1 May 1936 (age 90) Pretoria, Union of South Africa
- Relations: Oscar Galgut
- Education: University of Stellenbosch; University of Pretoria
- Profession: Advocate

Brian Galgut SC is a South African lawyer and former deputy judge president of the High Court in the Natal Provincial Division.

== Early life and education ==
Galgut was born in Pretoria and educated at Pretoria Boys High School. He was awarded a B.A. (Law) degree from Stellenbosch University in 1958, and a Bachelor of Laws degree from the University of Pretoria in 1960.

== Career ==
After completing his law degree at the University of Pretoria in 1960, Galgut was admitted as an advocate and practised as a member of the Pretoria Bar. He was accorded senior advocate status in 1979 and remained in practice, doing mostly civil work, until appointed as a judge in the Natal Provincial Division of the High Court in 1985.

In 2001 he was appointed as deputy judge president of the Division, and for three months in each of 2001 and 2004 served as the acting judge president. In 2004, having served for 20 years, Galgut elected to go off active service as a judge.

He has subsequently served as arbitrator in various civil claims, and in May 2007 was appointed as the ombudsman for long-term insurance, a post he held until May 2013. Since 2014 he has served as Internal Arbitrator at Santam Limited.
