= Midmar Commando =

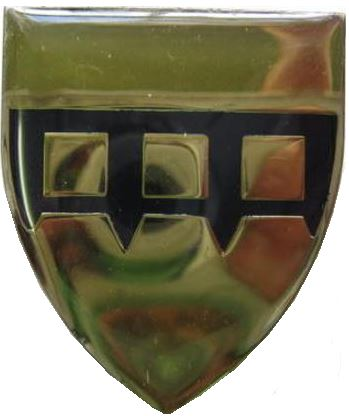
- Midmar Commando emblem
- Active: 1978-
- Country: South Africa
- Allegiance: Republic of South Africa; Republic of South Africa
- Branch: South African Army; South African Army
- Type: Infantry
- Role: Light Infantry
- Size: One Battalion
- Part of: South African Infantry Corps; Army Territorial Reserve, Group 9
- Garrison/HQ: Howick
- Motto(s): "Pro Aris et Focis" For Hearth and Home

Midmar Commando was a light infantry regiment of the South African Army. It formed part of the South African Army Infantry Formation as well as the South African Territorial Reserve.

== History ==
=== Origin ===
Raised in 1978 at Howick after a decision was reached that Umkomaas Commando was responsible for too large an area. C and D companies of Umkomaas Commando then formed the nucleus of this new unit.

=== Operations ===
==== With the SADF ====
The units headquarters was situated in an old World War Two hospital on the outskirts of Howick.

A shoulder flash for the unit was designed to represent the Midmar Dam wall and approved for use on 15 June 1982.

Colonel M.O. Norton was appointed as the unit's Honorary Colonel on 29 November 1986.

In October 1987, the Commando was mobilised to assist with humanitarian operations caused by heavy flooding in the Howick and surrounding areas as a result of heavy rains.

Midmar Commando was often deployed on operations to assist the South African Police during internal unrest.

==== With the SANDF ====
===== Disbandment =====
This unit, along with all other Commando units was disbanded after a decision by South African President Thabo Mbeki to disband all Commando Units. The Commando system was phased out between 2003 and 2008 "because of the role it played in the apartheid era", according to the Minister of Safety and Security Charles Nqakula.

== Unit Insignia ==
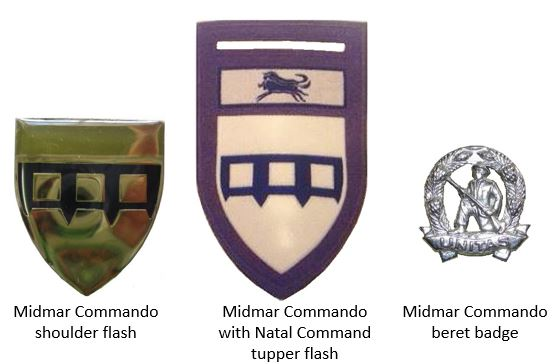
SADF era Midmar Commando insignia

== Leadership ==
- Cmdt M.O. Norton 1979-1981
- Cmdt A.M. Bosworth-Smith 1981-1984
- Cmdt I.H.W Rottcher 1984-1986
- Maj J.B. Weston 1986-1987
- Lt Col J.H. Hughes 1987-

== See also ==
- South African Commando System
