= Oscar Galgut =

South African judge

The Honourable Oscar Galgut OBE QC

Judge of the Supreme Court of Appeal of South Africa
- In office 1975–1976

Judge of the Transvaal Provincial Division of the Supreme Court
- In office 1957–1975

Personal details
- Born: 31 July 1906 Pretoria, Transvaal Colony
- Died: 22 May 1999 (aged 92) Pretoria, South Africa
- Children: Brian Galgut
- Education: Transvaal University College
- Profession: Attorney, Advocate
- Military career
- Allegiance: South Africa
- Branch: South African Air Force
- Service years: 1939–1945
- Rank: Lieutenant colonel
- Units: No. 24 Squadron SAAF; No. 3 Wing
- Commands: No. 24 Squadron SAAF; No. 3 Wing
- Conflicts: Second World War: East African Campaign; North African Campaign

Oscar Galgut (31 July 1906 – 22 May 1999) was a South African lawyer and Judge of Appeal in the Supreme Court of Appeal.

== Early life and education ==
Galgut was born in Pretoria on 31 July 1906 and matriculated at Pretoria Boys High School in 1923. He attended the Transvaal University College, graduating with a BA degree In 1924 and an LL.B. degree in 1928. Galgut first practised as an attorney in Pretoria and from 1935 as an advocate.

== Military career ==
During World War II, Galgut served as a lieutenant colonel in the SAAF's 24 Squadron, which was active in North and East Africa. He was also temporarily in command of 24 Squadron and later, acted three times as commanding officer of the SAAF 3 Wing. He was awarded an OBE for his military services.

== Judicial career ==
After the war Galgut returned to the Pretoria Bar, and in 1950, he took silk as a King's Counsel. He was appointed to the Transvaal Provincial Division of the Supreme Court in 1957 and in 1975, a year before his the compulsory retiring age of 70, he was elevated to the Appeal Court. Although he retired in 1976, he remained an acting Judge of the Appeal Court until 1986, when he was 80. He also served as Judge of Appeal of the Bophuthatswana and Ciskei Appeal Courts.

Galgut was chairman of the South African Press Council from 1977 until 1984 and from 1986 until 1996 he was the president in of the Advertising Standards Authority for South Africa.

== Sporting achievements ==
Galgut was a talented sportsman and while at university he received colours for cricket, tennis, hockey and athletics. He represented Combined Transvaal in athletics, and although he was selected for the Springbok team as a 110-meter hurdles, he could not go to Canada with the team due to study commitments. In hockey, he was selected in 1938 as vice-captain of the South African Hockey Union team to Kenya. It was the first ever South African hockey team, and it seems that for that reason, national colours was not awarded to its members.
