= Petrus Jacobs =

South African military commander

Major General Petrus Jacobs SSA SM
- Born: 1910
- Died: 1967 (aged 56–57)
- Relatives: Maria Elizabeth Stuart "Daisy" Duvenhage (wife)
- Military career
- Allegiance: Republic of South Africa
- Branch: South African Army
- Rank: Major General
- Commands: Army Chief of Staff
- Conflicts: World War II
- Awards

Major-General Petrus Jacobs SSA SM (1910-1967) was a South African military commander.

== Military career ==
He joined the South African Army as a part-time Citizen Force soldier in 1931 in the Prince Alfred's Guard and later became a full-time Permanent Force member. He served in World War II with the 2nd South African Division and with Wits Rifles in Italy.

Maj Gen Jacobs was Army Chief of Staff from 1963 to 1965.

== Awards and decorations ==
- Star of South Africa (1952) (SSA)
- Southern Cross Medal (1952) (SM)

== See also ==
- List of South African military chiefs
- South African Army

Military offices
Preceded by Sybrand Engelbrecht	Chief of the South African Army; 1963 – 1965	Succeeded by Charles 'Pop' Fraser
Preceded by PH Grobbelaar	Commandant SA Military College; 1953 – 1956	Succeeded by SJ Engelbrecht
