= Regiment Port Natal =

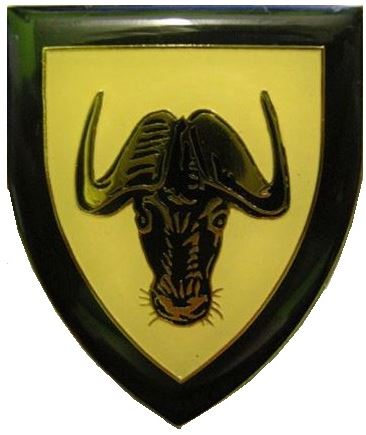
- Regiment Port Natal emblem
- Active: 1969
- Country: South Africa
- Allegiance: Republic of South Africa
- Branch: South African Army
- Type: Infantry
- Role: Motorised Infantry
- Size: One Battalion
- Part of: South African Infantry Corps; Army Conventional Reserve
- Garrison/HQ: Durban
- Motto(s): Latin: Oppugnamus (Attack)

Regiment Port Natal was a motorised infantry regiment of the South African Army. It formed part of the South African Army Infantry Formation. As a reserve unit, it had a status roughly equivalent to that of a present-day British Army Reserve or United States Army National Guard unit.

== History ==
=== Origin ===
In 1969, Durban Regiment was instructed to transfer all Afrikaans speaking unit members to a newly formed unit, Regiment Port Natal.

=== Operations ===
Regiment Port Natal saw active service on internal security duties in the Natal Province.

Regiment Port Natal was assigned to 84 Motorised Brigade.

=== Amalgamation ===
Regiment Port Natal was eventually amalgamated with Durban Light Infantry Regiment in the 1980s.

=== Colours ===
The Regiment was awarded its Regimental Colour – a wildebeest head with the motto Oppugnamus on a black silk background – in July 1974 by Mr P W Botha, the then Minister of Defence.

On 14 July 1990, National Colours were presented to the Regiment by Major General D J Mortimer.

== Insignia ==
=== Dress Insignia ===
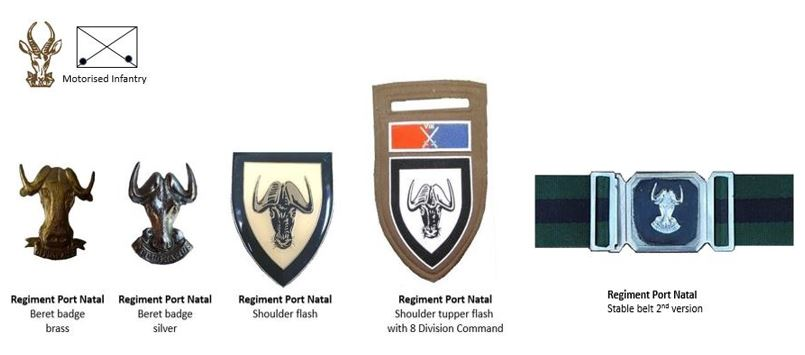
SADF era Regiment Port Natal insignia
