= Bluff Commando =

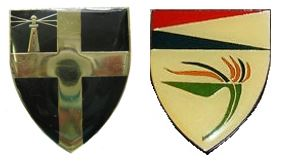
- Bluff Commando / Regiment Congella emblems
- Active: Congella (1980)
- Country: South Africa
- Allegiance: Republic of South Africa; Republic of South Africa
- Branch: South African Army; South African Army
- Type: Infantry
- Role: Light Infantry
- Size: One Battalion
- Part of: South African Infantry Corps; Army Territorial Reserve, Group 10
- Garrison/HQ: Bluff, KwaZulu-Natal, Blamey Road Montclair Durban

Bluff Commando, later the Congella Regiment, was a light infantry regiment of the South African Army. It formed part of the South African Army Infantry Formation as well as the South African Territorial Reserve.

== History ==
=== Origin ===
This unit was one of several 'urban commandos' which were established in 1962, when the Army's focus was on internal security. It was transferred from the Commandos to the Citizen Force (South African Infantry Corps) in the 1980s, and renamed 'Congella Regiment'. It was disbanded in the 1990s.

=== Operations ===
==== With the SADF ====
It was raised in 1980 and its first headquarters was at Bluff Commando HQ on Salisbury Island on the SA Navy Base. The Regiment was later moved to Blamey Road Montclair.

By 1990, Durban Regiment, Congella Regiment and 12 Reception Depot were all placed under command of Group 10. The regimental badge was based on the Inniskilling Fusiliers castle.

Congella Regiment was deployed to South West Africa on border duties and also participated in numerous deployments within South Africa to combat internal unrest.

Congella Regiment had a unique composition in that it had specialist components such as a tactical support team and dog handlers.

== Leadership ==
Leadership
From	Honorary Colonels	To	Ribbon
	No known incumbents		
From	Commanding Officer	To	Ribbon
1980	Cmdt I. Deetlefs	1984	
1984	Cmdt D. Edgecombe	1989	
1989	Cmdt K.R. Brewis	1995	
1995	Lt Col J.A. Moxham	nd	
From	Regimental Sergeant Major	To	Ribbon
	No known incumbents		

== Insignia ==
=== Dress Insignia ===
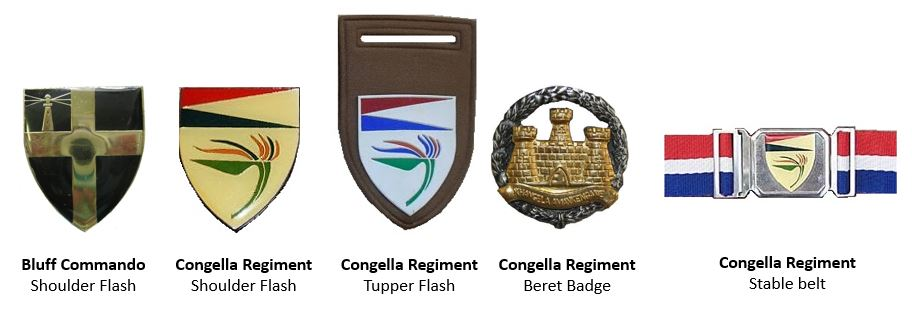
SADF Bluff Commando Regiment Congella insignia

== See also ==
- South African Commando System
