= Sybrand Engelbrecht (soldier) =

South African Army general (1913–1994)

Major General Sybrand Abraham Engelbrecht SM
- Born: 4 April 1913; Clanwilliam, Western Cape
- Died: 6 September 1994 (aged 81)
- Burial place: Voortrekkerhoogte, South Africa
- Military career
- Allegiance: Republic of South Africa
- Branch: South African Army
- Service years: 1936 – 1963
- Rank: Major General
- Commands: Army Chief of Staff; SSO Explosives; Deputy Quartermaster General; OC North West Transvaal Command; OC Northern Command (South Africa)
- Awards: Southern Cross Medal SM

Sybrand Abraham Engelbrecht SM (4 April 1913 – 6 September 1994) was a South African military commander. He was born in Clanwilliam, and joined the South African Army in June 1936. He was appointed 2nd Lieutenant in January 1937. He attended an Ordnance Officers Course at the Royal Military College of Science from January 1939 to July 1939. He served in World War II in the Middle East.

After the War he served as the Dean of the Military College. He was then SSO Explosives, Deputy Quartermaster General, Officer Commanding North West Transvaal Command and Officer Commanding Northern Command (South Africa).

He served as Army Chief of Staff from 1959 to 1963, when he took early retirement. He returned to active duty for a few years in the 1970s, as a staff officer with the South African Special Forces.

== Awards and decorations ==
- Southern Cross Medal (1952) (SM)

== See also ==
- List of South African military chiefs
- South African Army

Military offices
Preceded by Nick Bierman	Army Chief of Staff; 1959–1963	Succeeded by Petrus Jacobs			
Preceded by Petrus Jacobs	Commandant Military College; 1956–1957	Succeeded by PD de Lange			
Preceded by Norman Nauhaus	OC Western Transvaal Command; 1955–1956	Succeeded by Bull Jacobs			
Unknown	OC Northern Command unknown	Unknown	New	Dean Military Academy; 1950–1951	Succeeded by Melt van Niekerk
