= King Shaka Regiment =

Durban Volunteer Guides Durban Regiment King Shaka Regiment
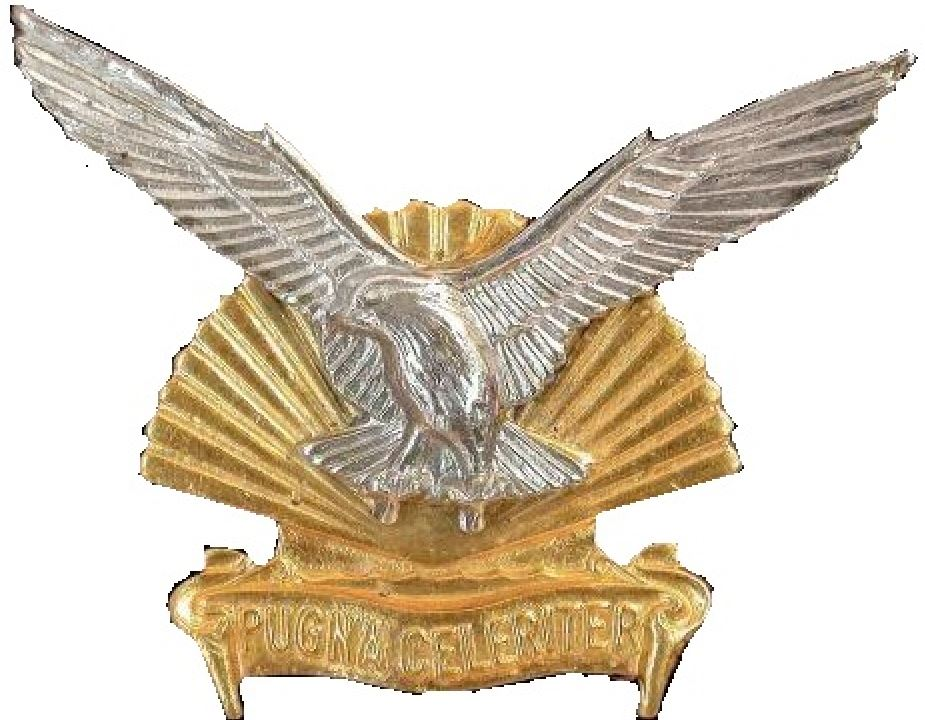
- SANDF Durban Regiment emblem
- Active: 1 January 1960 to present
- Country: South Africa
- Allegiance: Republic of South Africa; Republic of South Africa
- Branch: South African Army; South African Army
- Type: Infantry
- Role: Mechanised infantry
- Size: One Battalion
- Part of: South African Infantry Formation; Army Conventional Reserve
- Garrison/HQ: Lord's Grounds, Durban, Kwa-Zulu Natal 29°51′1.7454″S 31°1′22.08″E
- Motto: Latin: Punga Celeriter (Strike swiftly)

Insignia
- Identification symbol: Silver Fish Eagle on a Gold Sea Shell
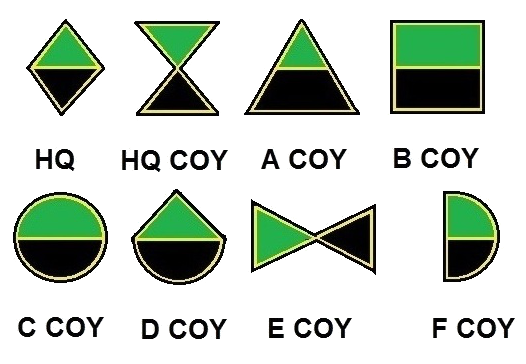
- Company level Insignia

- SA Motorised Infantry beret bar circa 1992: SA Motorised Infantry beret bar
- Abbreviation: KSR

The King Shaka Regiment (formerly the Durban Regiment) is a reserve motorised infantry battalion of the South African Army.

== History ==
=== Origin ===
Established in 1923 as the Durban Volunteer Guides, the unit was disbanded after World War Two but reformed on paper in 1959 as an armoured infantry unit.

Durban Regiment was officially proclaimed in 1959 and the first posting to the unit was on 1 January 1960 with Colonel M.B. Williams JCD with 30 Yr Clasp as its first officer commanding.

=== Internal operations ===
The Regiment's first mobilisations were on 31 March 1960 to combat unrest in Natal's Cato Manor area. They were, in fact, the first regiment mobilised and committed to this action.

On 31 May 1961 the unit was again mobilised for participation in the ceremonies accompanying the Declaration of the Republic of South Africa.

=== Type conversion ===
First formed as an armoured infantry regiment, the Durban Regiment was later converted to motorised infantry.

The regiment received its Regimental Colours on 10 October 1964.

=== Language ===
In 1969, the Durban Regiment was instructed to transfer all Afrikaans speaking unit members to a newly formed unit, Regiment Port Natal (RPN).

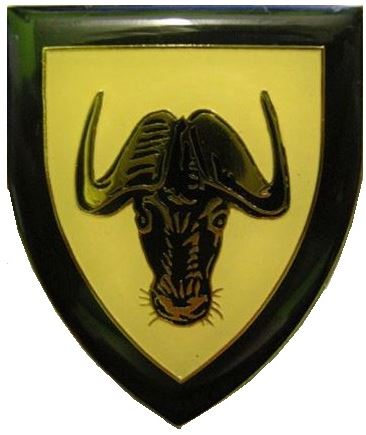
SADF Regiment Port Natal emblem

=== Band ===
As from the formal inauguration of the unit, authority was acquired for the formation of a military band that functioned to support the unit at military functions and parades. In 1976 the Montclair Pipe band (a civilian band) affiliated to the military band and over a very short time the pipe contingent absorbed the bugles and trumpets of the military band. The Durban Regiment Pipe Band now forms the musical component at the unit and effectively supports the unit at military functions and parades.

=== Training ===
Annual training camps were completed every year until 1972 when Durban Regiment began duties on either the South West Africa (Namibia) or Mozambique borders during the South African Border War. In addition to the border duties, from 1982, Durban Regiment also became involved in counter insurgency operations in urban operations in urban areas, mainly in the Kwa-Zulu Natal area.

=== Freedom of the City ===
On its 21st birthday in 1981, the Durban Regiment was granted the freedom of the City of Durban.

=== Garrison ===
In 1999 the Durban Regiment moved headquarters to the Drill Hall at the Old Fort Road Military Base in Durban.

=== Post 1994 and the SANDF ===
==== Peacekeeping deployments ====
The first volunteer camp was held in the Boshoek training area near Ladysmith for two weeks in February 1995. The first member of colour volunteer to do service as guard duties was in August 1995. The same member served as an officer with the first army conventional reserve force company to deploy externally to the Democratic Republic of the Congo for peace support operations.

In January 2005, Durban Regiment contributed 20 members (one officer, 6 NCOs and thirteen riflemen) to the Reserve Force company that deployed with 7 South African Infantry Battalion to the DRC.

Durban Regiment also supplied 13 members to the Reserve Force company that was deployed with 2 SAI deploying to the DRC in June 2005.

In June 2006, Durban Regiment supplied a Company HQ and a platoon to 5 SAI's contingent deployed to Burundi. In July 2007, Durban Regiment provided a mortar section to 5 SAI for another deployment to Burundi. In July 2008, Durban Regiment supplied a rifle platoon to 121 BN for the UN peace support operation to the DRC, MONUSCO.

==== Name change ====
In August 2019, 52 Reserve Force units had their names changed to reflect the diverse military history of South Africa. The Durban Regiment became the King Shaka Regiment, with three years to design and implement new regimental insignia.

== Leadership ==
Leadership
From	Honorary Colonel	To	Ribbon
	No known incumbents		
From	Officer Commanding	To	Ribbon
1960	Col M.B. Williams	nd	
1963	Lt Col Lloyd	nd	
1998	Lt Col Goldstone	nd	
2002	Lt Col Barrow	nd	
2005	Lt Col A.W. Mac Donald	nd	
2014	Lt Col D Russel	nd	
nd	Lt Col Sibonelo Linda	nd	
From	Regimental Sergeant Major	To	Ribbon
nd	MWO D. Mdolo	nd	

== Insignia ==
The Durban Regiment badge consists of a silver fish eagle on a gold sea shell with the motto Punga Celeriter (Strike swiftly).

=== Previous dress insignia ===
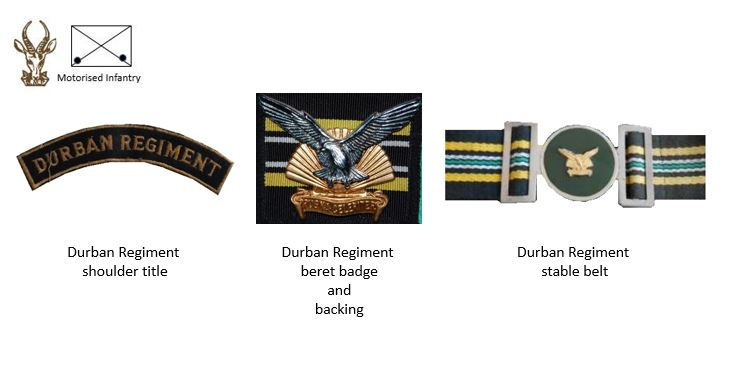
SADF era Durban Regiment insignia

=== Current dress insignia ===
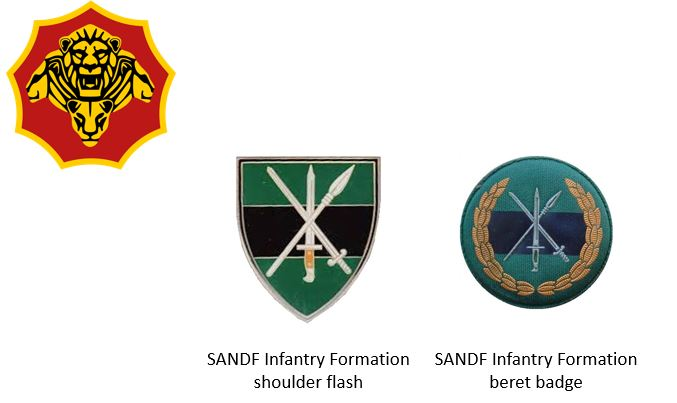
SANDF era Infantry Formation insignia

== Motto ==
- "Punga Celeriter" ("Strike swiftly")
