= Pinard =

Pinard may refer to:

- Pinard horn, a type of pregnancy stethoscope invented by Adolphe Pinard
- Pinard (wine), a French term for red wine, associated with World War I

== People ==
- Adolphe Pinard (1844–1934), French obstetrician
- Adrien Pinard (1916–1998), Canadian psychologist
- Claude Pinard (born 1949), Canadian politician
- Daniel Pinard (1942–2024), Canadian radio and television personality
- Ian Pinard, Dominican politician
- Joseph Albert Pinard (1878–1964), Canadian politician
- Lancelot Pinard (1902–2001), Caribbean-born calypso singer known as Sir Lancelot
- Pascal Pinard (born 1965), French swimmer
- Roch Pinard (1910–1974), Canadian politician
- Yvon Pinard (born 1940), Canadian judge and politician

== See also ==
- Ciel, mon Pinard!, a Quebec cookery program with Daniel Pinard
- Pienaar, a surname
