= Pienaar =

Pienaar is a well-known Afrikaans surname, derived from the French Pinard. It was brought to South Africa in 1688 by Huguenot settlers traveling with the Dutch East India Company. The extended progenitors of the Pienaar clan are Jacques Pinard, a carpenter from Eure-et-Loir, and Esther Foucher (born Suèvres, Orléanais). After Esther's death Pinard later remarried Marthe le Fèbre, a native of Paarl. An extensive genealogy of the Pienaar family in South Africa was compiled by ZJ (Sakkie) Pienaar, and privately published as "Die Pienaars in Suid-Afrika." An updated version of the Pienaar genealogy was compiled by Christo Viljoen, whose mother was née Pienaar, as the "Pienaar Familieregister" and published by the Huguenot Society of South Africa.

Some of the descendants of the Pienaar progenitors include:

- Antoinette Pienaar, South African actress and writer
- Ben Pienaar, British rugby player
- Dan Pienaar, South African career soldier
- Francois Pienaar, South African rugby player
- Gerhardus Pienaar, South African javelin thrower
- John Pienaar, British journalist
- Jonathan Pienaar, South African actor
- Louis Pienaar, South African diplomat
- Michael Pienaar, Namibian football player
- Pierre de Villiers Pienaar, South African academic
- Roy Pienaar, South African cricketer
- Ruan Pienaar, South African rugby player
- Steven Pienaar, South African football player
- Trix Pienaar, South African actress and writer
- Petrus Arnoldus Pienaar, South African Dutch Reformed Minister

== Characters in fiction ==
- Peter Pienaar, fictional World War I flying ace
- Ross Pienaar, fictional character in the movie "District 9"

== See also ==
- Pienaarsrivier
- Pienaars River
- Johan Pienaar Airport
