= Special Service Battalion =

- SSB Cap Badge
- Active: 1 May 1933 – 1953
- Country: Union of South Africa
- Allegiance: Union of South Africa
- Branch: South African Army
- Nickname: SSB (English)/SDB (Afrikaans)
- Motto: Eendrag Maakt Mag (Unity is Strength)
- Engagements: World War II

Commanders
- Notable commanders: Lt Col George Brink Lt Col CEG (Papa) Brits; Lt Col WHE Poole Lt Col HB Klopper

The Special Service Battalion (SSB) is a South African military unit formed on 1 May 1933 under the patronage of Oswald Pirow, Minister of Defence. The object was to give training to youths, between the ages of 17 and 23, who, in the wake of the 1929 depression, could find no suitable employment on leaving school.

== History ==
Lt Col George E Brink was given the responsibility for establishing the battalion at Roberts Heights and was the first commanding officer. The SSB was established to save the youth from physical and moral degeneration caused by massive unemployment due to the Great Depression. The SSB was to teach the young men military discipline, fitness and various trades to enable them to be employed by the Department of Labour and Welfare. The SSB men received a salary of a shilling a day causing the SSB soon to be known as the "Bob a Day Battalion"

In 1934 detachments were also established for 100 trainees at Durban and 150 at Cape Town. Training included elementary military subjects and physical training. After a year of the young men usually found employment in government departments or with civilian employers. By 1936 the output of the SSB totalled about 2000 youths a year. In 1937 the South African Railways established at Roberts Heights a special school to prepare boys for the railways. In 1937 3788 youths passed through the ranks of the SSB. A total of 882 of them joined the Permanent Force.

With the expansion of the South African Air Force in 1937 the SSB provided 248 air apprentices for special training but, with the improvement in the economic situation, the waiting list to join the battalion had dwindled to almost nil.

With the outbreak of war in September 1939, members of the SSB were posted to units requiring immediate reinforcement to get on to a wartime basis. An example of this being the Coastal Artillery. In February 1940 a number of troops were transferred to the 1st and 2nd Field Force Battalions. These served with distinction in East Africa, Abyssinia and the Middle East as part of 1st South African Division.

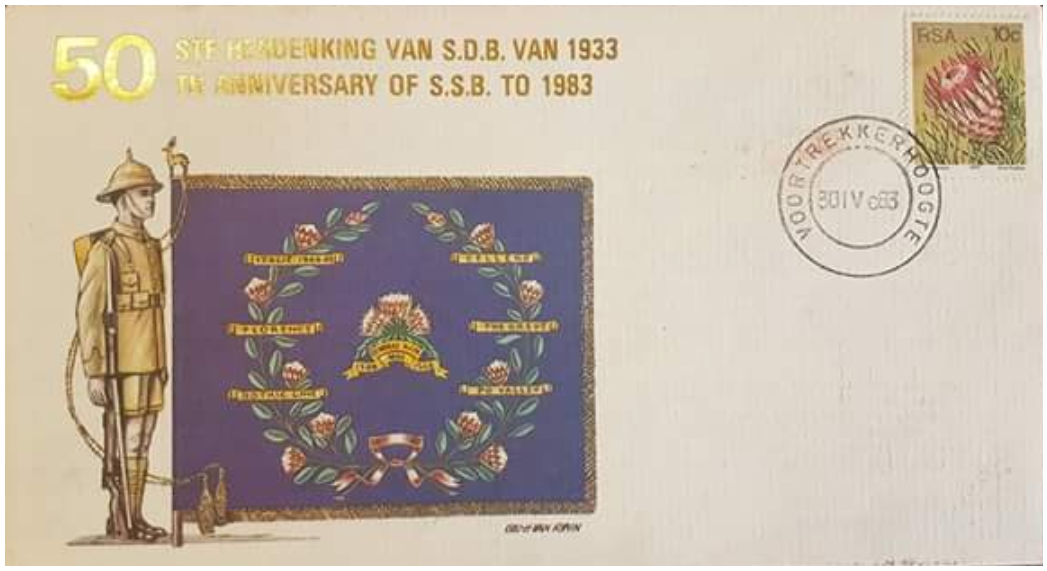
SADF era 1 SSB Commemorative Letter

In August 1941 all members of the SSB below the age of 18 were transferred to the Youth Training Brigade. The remainder formed an infantry battalion, which was converted to an armoured car commando in 1942.

In February 1943 the SSB, under Lt Col EG ('Papa') Brits, became part of the 11th SA Armoured Brigade. In March 1943 the Field Force Battalion was disbanded and other ranks and some of the officers were transferred to the SSB, thus providing a nucleus of battle-tested veterans.

The unit sailed for the Middle East with the 6th SA Armoured Division in April 1943. In 1944 the division crossed the Mediterranean Sea to take part in the Italian campaign. The regiment played a prominent part in numerous actions during the campaign.

In 1946, SSB was resuscitated as a Permanent Force unit and reorganised on a two-battalion basis with the 1st Battalion as an armoured unit and the 2nd Battalion infantry. The former became a training regiment in 1953 and the latter was renamed the 1 South African Infantry Battalion (1SAI) in 1951.

== Regimental symbols ==
- The cap badge is a spray of three protea flowers, bound by a ribbon bearing the initials and motto.
- Regimental motto: Eendrag Maakt Mag (Unity is Strength)

=== Red tabs ===
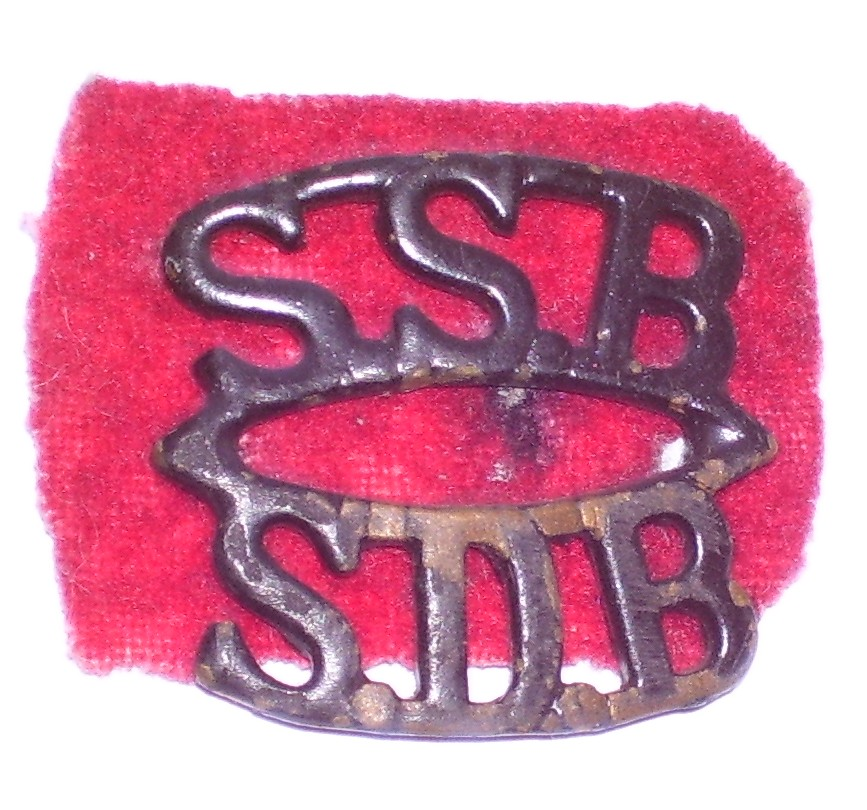
SSB shoulder title and wartime "red tabs"

The South African Defence Act (Act No 13 of 1912) was vague in its description of where members of the Union Defence Force could be deployed. Because the act could be interpreted as not making provision for active service by UDF units beyond the Union's borders and "the prevailing tense political climate", Field Marshal Jan Smuts, the prime minister, declared that only volunteers would make up a fighting force beyond the country's borders. The volunteers were required to sign a document known as the 'Africa Oath', in which they declared that they would be prepared to fight anywhere in Africa. They were distinguished from other members of the UDF by orange-scarlet shoulder tabs worn on their uniforms and commonly referred to as 'red tabs'.

According to Professor Andrè Wessels of the Department of History at the University of the Orange Free State, Bloemfontein, "the wearing of these tabs caused a lot of resentment, by stigmatising both those who were prepared to fight and those who opposed active involvement (depending on one's political outlook), and was one way of exerting pressure on UDF members to volunteer for active service". The author Alan Paton mentioned the red tabs/flash in his 1953 novel, Too Late the Phalarope. The South African Police also wore them, and they were derogatorily called the "red lice".

== Leadership ==
Special Service Battalion Leadership
From	Honorary Colonels	To	Ribbon
nd	unknown	Present	
From	Commanding Officers	To	Ribbon
nd	Lt Col George Brink	nd	
20 June 1940	Lt Col CEG (Papa) Brits	21 June 1945	
nd	Lt Col WHE Poole	nd	
nd	Lt Col HB Klopper	nd	
From	Regimental Sergeants Major	To	Ribbon
	No known incumbents		

== Battle honours ==
Italy 1944–1945, Florence, Gothic Line, Celleno, The Greve, Po Valley

Battle Honours
Awarded to Special Service Battalion
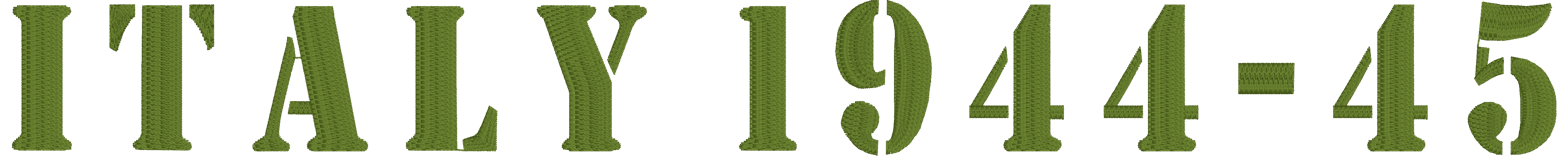
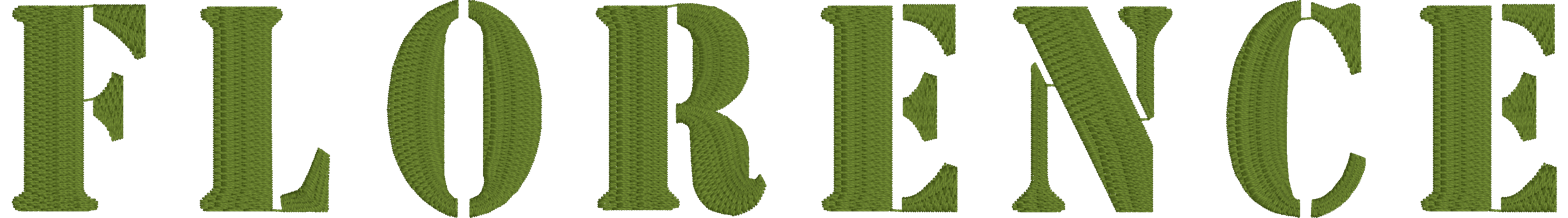
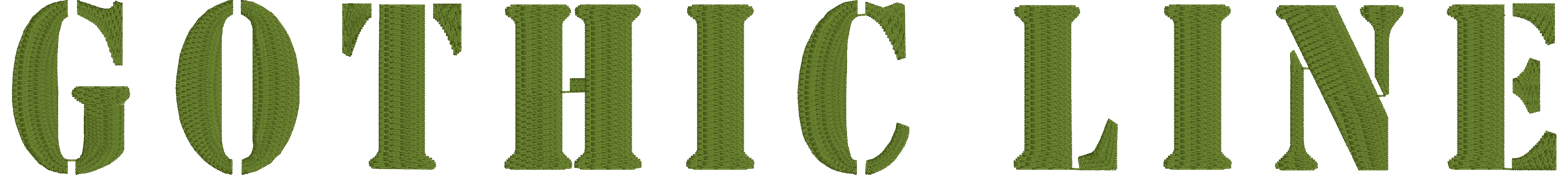
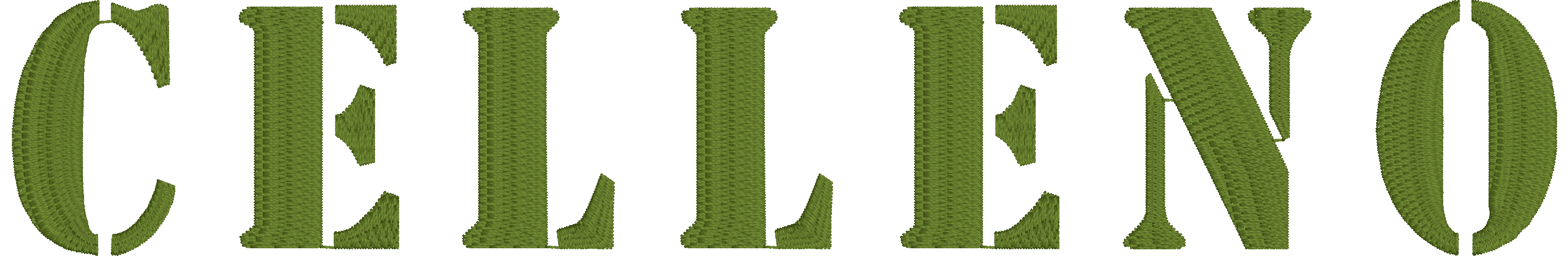
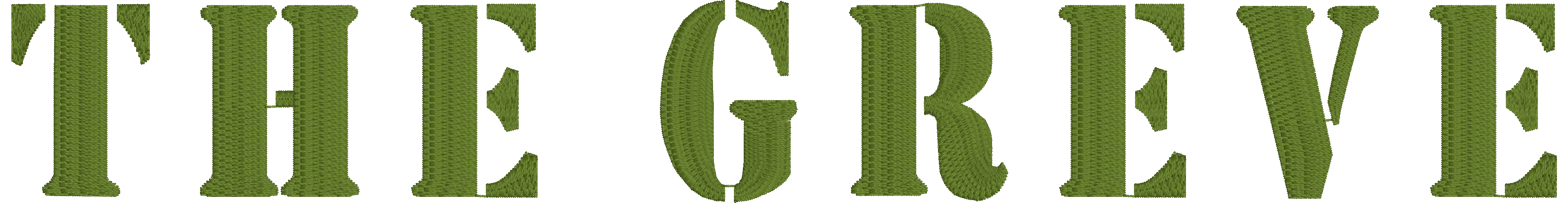
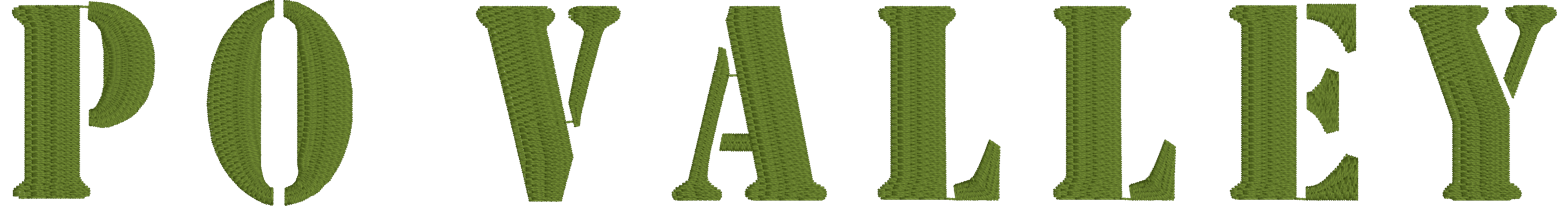

== Museums ==
The regimental museum of 1 Special Service Battalion in Bloemfontein tells the story of the special unit that was born as a result of the Great Depression. Articles in the museum date from this period.

The SA Armour Museum, on the grounds of Tempe Military Base, exhibits various items dealing specifically with military armour. It consists of an indoor-, outdoor-, and reference library area.
