= George Brink =

South African military commander

George Edwin Brink
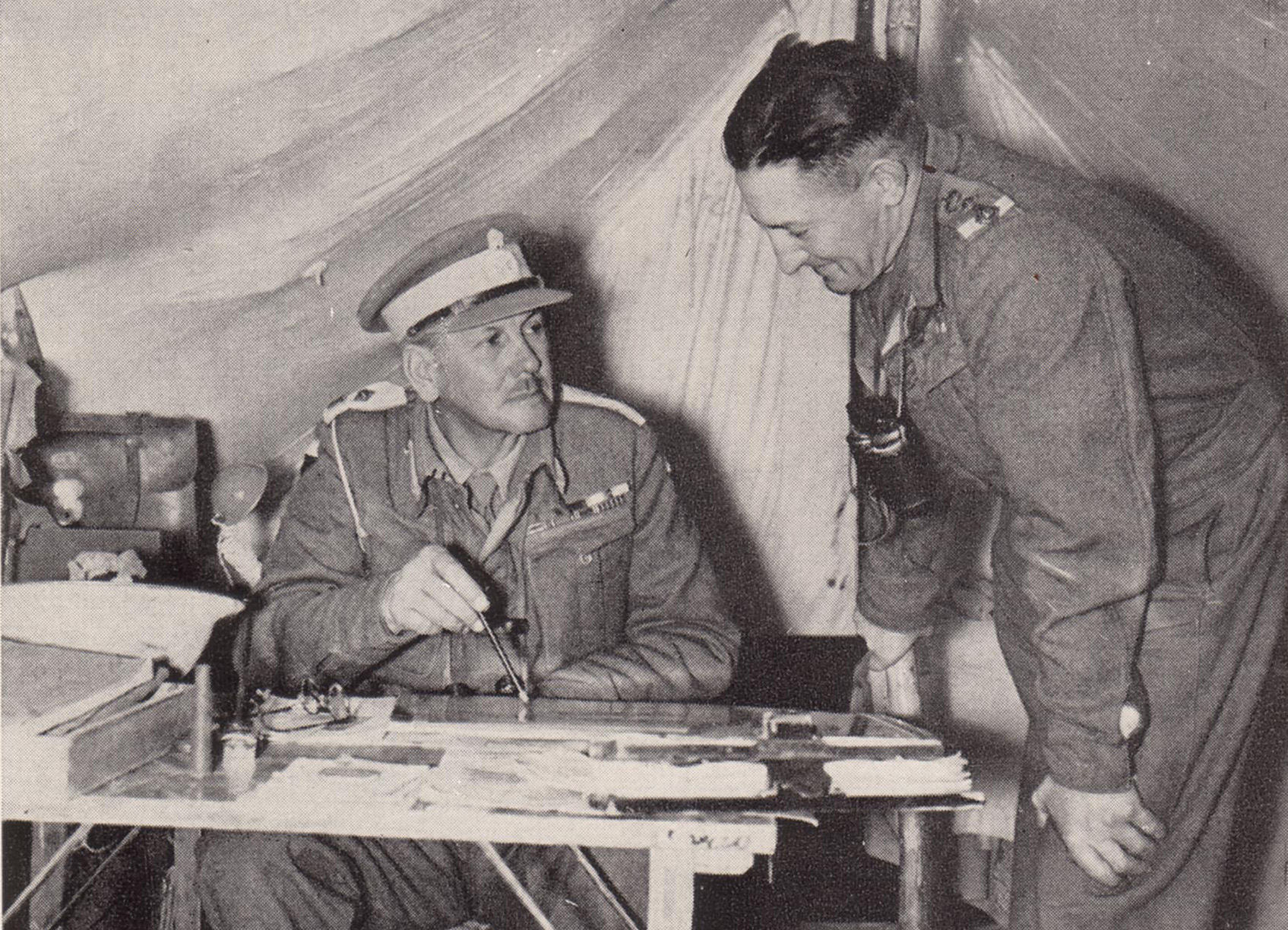
- General George Brink (seated) in the Western Desert, 1941
- Born: 27 September 1889; Jagersfontein, Orange Free State
- Died: 30 April 1971 (aged 81); St. Michaels-on-Sea, Natal, South Africa
- Military career
- Allegiance: South Africa
- Branch: South African Army
- Service years: 1913–1946
- Rank: Lieutenant General
- Service number: 240261
- Commands: Inland Area Command (1942–44); 1st Infantry Division (1940–42); Western Cape Command (1933–37); Special Service Battalion (1933); South African Military College (1932–33)
- Conflicts: World War I; South West Africa campaign; Maritz rebellion; East Africa campaign; World War II; East Africa campaign; Western Desert campaign
- Awards: Companion of the Order of the Bath; Commander of the Order of the British Empire; Distinguished Service Order; Grand Officer of the Order of Orange-Nassau (Netherlands); Croix de Guerre (France)

Lieutenant General George Edwin Brink, CB, CBE, DSO (27 September 1889 – 30 April 1971) was a South African military commander.

== Early life ==
Brink was born at Jagersfontein, Orange Free State, on 27 September 1889 to Johan Godlieb Brink and Elizabeth Johanna Margarita Hartog. During the Second Boer War, he was interned in the Vredefort Road concentration camp for thirteen months. He was educated at Grey College, Bloemfontein, graduating in 1907. Prior to his military career, he worked for the Free State Education Department in 1908, as private secretary to the Commissioner of Police in 1909 and from 1910, at the Voorspoed Diamond Company.

== Military career ==
In 1913, Brink joined the Union Defence Forces and was commissioned in October 1914. As a staff officer in Southern Command, he saw action during the Maritz rebellion and later in the South West Africa campaign in the First World War where he became a brigade major in the 10^{th} Mounted Brigade. He became a staff captain in April 1916 with the 1^{st} SA Mounted Brigade and served in German East Africa during the first East African Campaign. He returned to South Africa in 1918 where he assisted in the demobilisation of overseas South African forces.

In 1919, he attended the Imperial Staff College graduating in 1920. On his return to South Africa, Brink was appointed to the staff of the South African Military College in 1921, later being appointed Commandant of the College in 1933.

In 1933, Brink was appointed the first Officer Commanding of the Special Service Battalion. In December of that year, Colonel Brink was posted to Cape Town to take command of the Western Cape Command, where he served till 31 January 1937. From 1 November 1937 to 1939, he was Director of Army Training at Defence Headquarters. He was promoted to Deputy Chief of the General Staff on 15 June 1938.

From 1 October 1940 to 1942, Brink commanded the 1st South African Division during the second East African Campaign. He also commanded the division during the Western Desert Campaign in North Africa.

In March 1942, Brink turned over command of the division to Dan Pienaar. After hurting his back and being declared unfit for field duty, Brink then commanded the Inland Area Command in South Africa from 1 July 1942 to September 1944.

From September 1944 to 31 March 1948, Brink was in charge of demobilisation of South African forces. He had already retired from the Permanent Force in 1946 and promoted to lieutenant general in the Reserves.

== Post military career ==
He was chairman of the Immigrants' Selection Board from April 1948 until March 1950, and various other honorary chairmanships for the National Navy Week Appeal (1947), National War Memorial Health Foundation (1948–51), the South African War Museum and South African War Graves Board (1967-1969). He was also vice-president of the Torch Commando until May 1953. Brink unsuccessfully stood as a candidate in the 1953 South African general election for the Pretoria City constituency for the United Party.

== Marriage ==
Brink married Lillian Alice de Villiers in August 1919 and they had three daughters.

== Awards ==
During his military career, Brink was awarded the Croix de Guerre avec Palmes, Distinguished Service Order, Companion of the Order of the Bath in 1941, and Commander of the Order of the British Empire in 1942. He was also appointed Grand Officer of the Order of Orange-Nassau.

- Order of the Bath (Companion) (CB) (Great Britain)
- Order of the British Empire (Commander) (CBE) (Great Britain)
- Distinguished Service Order (DSO) (Great Britain)
- Croix de guerre 1914–1918 (Palme de bronze - Bronze palm) (France)

Military offices
| Preceded by Pierre van Ryneveld | Officer Commanding South African Military College; 1932–1933 | Succeeded by Pieter de Waal |
| New command | Commanding Officer Special Service Battalion; May–November 1933 | Succeeded by Pieter de Waal |
| Unknown | Officer Commander Western Cape Command; 1933–1937 | Unknown |
| New command | General Officer Commanding 1st South African Division; 1940–1942 | Succeeded by Dan Pienaar |
