= Dan Pienaar =

South African Army general

Major General Daniel Hermanus Pienaar CB DSO & two bars
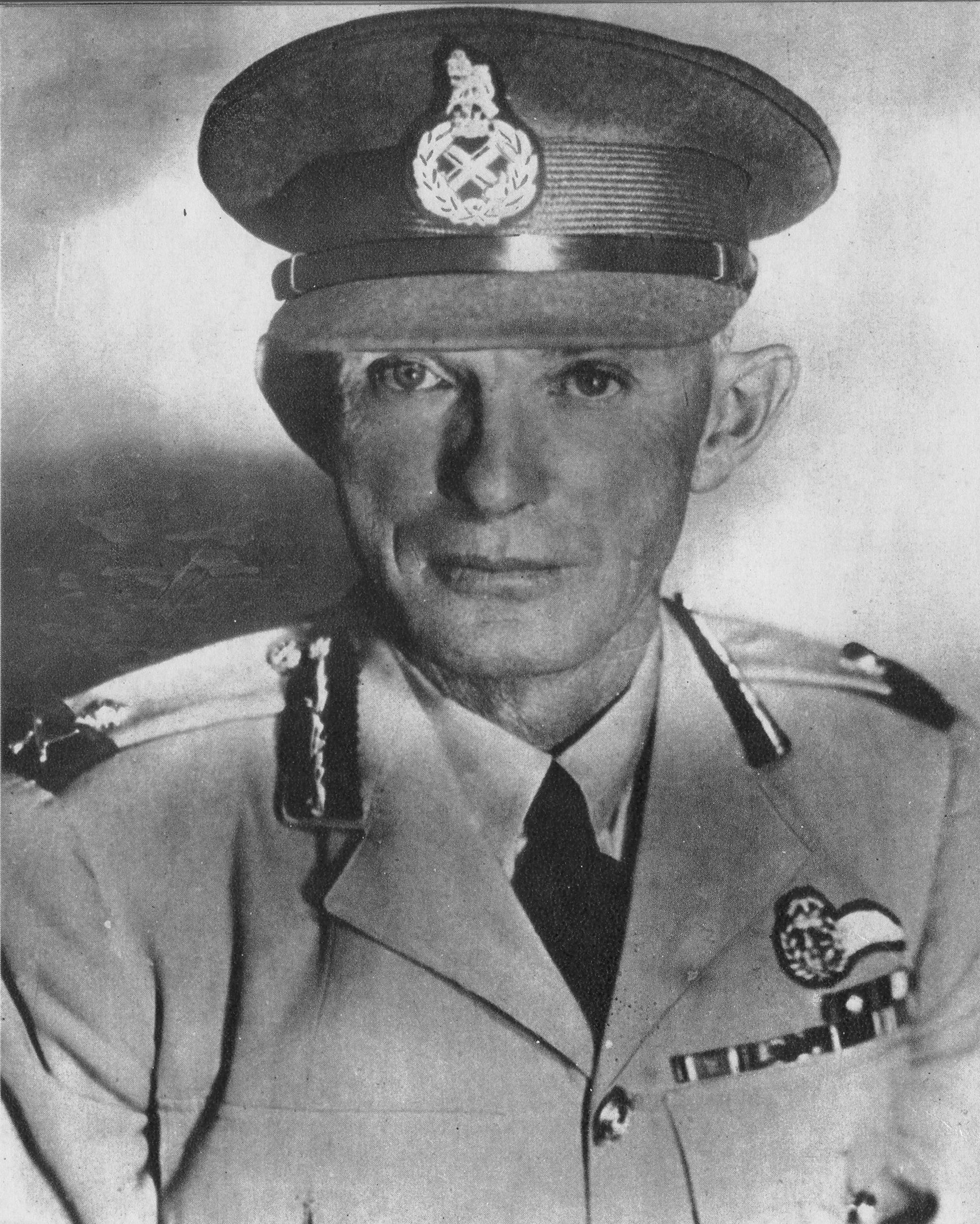
- Born: 27 August 1893; Ladybrand, Orange Free State
- Died: 19 December 1942 (aged 49); Kisumu, Kenya
- Military career
- Allegiance: Union of South Africa
- Service years: 1911–1942
- Rank: Major General
- Nickname: Dan
- Service number: 126242
- Commands: 1st Infantry Brigade; 1st Infantry Division
- Wars: World War I; World War II
- Awards: Order of the Bath CB Distinguished Service Order and two Bars DSO & 2 Bars

Major General Daniel Hermanus Pienaar (27 August 1893 – 19 December 1942) CB DSO & two bars was a South African World War II military commander known for his caution and insubordination during the North African Campaign.

== Early life and career ==
He was born in Ladybrand, Orange Free State and in his youth grew up in Natal. His family members had fought against the British during the Second Boer War. Pienaar joined the artillery branch of the Natal Police (NP) in 1911, and transferred to the Union Defence Forces (UDF) when they took over the NP in 1913. In World War I, he first served as an artilleryman in the South West Africa campaign, then with the South African Overseas Expeditionary Force in German East Africa in the South African Field Artillery Brigade and was mentioned several times in dispatches and then later in Palestine from 1917 until 1918 finishing the war with the rank of subaltern in the British Army.

== Between the wars ==
He returned to the South Africa and back into the Union Defence Force ranks at the end of the war. He was commissioned and sent to England to train as battery commander as well as attending a staff officers course. He returned to South Africa in 1922 and was promoted to Adjutant of the South African Field Artillery. In 1930 he was a Lieutenant-Colonel of 1st Field Service Brigade in Ladysmith. He commanded Orange Free State Command from 1935 to 1937. Other positions held were Voortrekkerhoogte and Transvaal Commands. When war started he was promoted to Brigadier.

== World War II ==
In 1940–1941, during the East African Campaign, Pienaar commanded the 1st South African Infantry Brigade. He fought in the battles of El Wak, The Juba, Combolcia and Amba Alagi. After Amba Alagi fell, the brigade was dispatched to Libya.

In 1941–1942, during the North Africa Campaign, Pienaar fought in the battles of Sidi Rezegh and Gazala. On 10 March 1942, he was promoted to Major-General GOC 1st South African Infantry Division, which he led in the Battle of Gazala, the retreat to Egypt, the defence of El Alamein and the Second Battle of El Alamein. He was twice awarded the DSO and twice mentioned in dispatches for his service in North Africa. He was recorded by the press after El Alamein as saying, "Rommel will not get to Alexandria, he will not get the Canal, and he will never dine in Cairo - unless as a tourist."

During the early stages of Operation Crusader, the 5th South African Brigade was destroyed on 23 November 1941 at Sidi Rezegh. This loss is thought to have spurred Pienaar to disobey a series of orders to engage the enemy over the remainder of the battle. Pienaar's 1st South African Brigade was situated 25 miles south of Sidi Rezegh at Taieb El Esem. Over the following week, Pienaar was first ordered to hold position at Taieb El Esem and later to move north to relieve the encircled 2nd New Zealand Division of XIII Corps. Instead, Pienaar defied his superiors; his brigade withdrew from Taieb El Esem and was then slow to move north to relieve the 2nd New Zealand Division, who were then partly overrun and forced to retreat. Historians have argued these actions qualify as insubordination by Pienaar, who is thought to have been reluctant to commit his troops after the loss of the 5th South African Brigade, fabricating or exaggerating reports of enemy attacks as justification for actions. However, despite incurring the anger of senior commanders at the time, he was not formally disciplined.

On 21 June 1942, the 2nd South African Infantry Division, with 4th and 6th brigades under command, surrendered at the fall of Tobruk.

On the other hand, Ronald Lewin, who took part in the entire campaign, writes: "what is striking . . . is how often the British would squander a complete armoured brigade in some useless assault on a fixed position." Pienaar simply did not buy into the "Up Guards and at 'em!" approach of the British, which led to the decimation of the Commonwealth and Indian divisions that bore the brunt of so much of the fighting in the Desert War. "You know the three things I hate in this world—British lords, British generals and these bloody Guards!" he told Brigadier E. P. Hartshorn. regarding the loss of Tobruk in 1942. Churchill wrote in volume 4 of his memoirs, The Hinge of Fate, "The burden of blame falls upon the [British] High Command rather than on [the fortress commander, South African] General [Hendrik] Klopper and still less on his troops."

On 20 November 1942 he was appointed Companion of the Order of the Bath (CB) "in recognition of the supreme gallantry and magnificent achievements of British and Dominion Troops and their Commanders in the present operations in the Middle East".

== Death and legacy ==
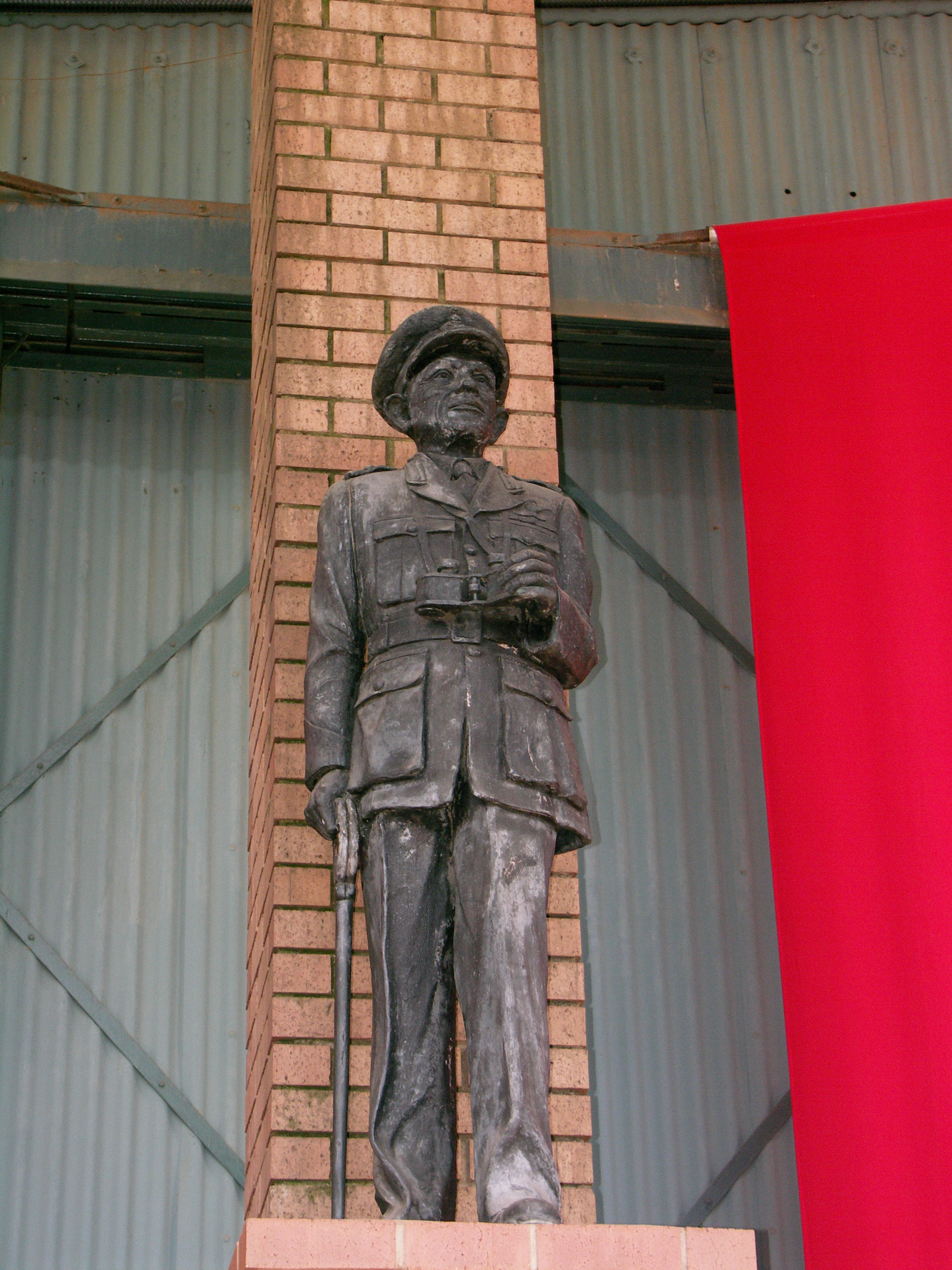
Memorial to Maj-Gen Dan Pienaar at the South African War Museum, Johannesburg

In 1942, Major General Pienaar was killed in an air crash in Kenya on his way back to South Africa. The plane crash occurred early Saturday morning in Kavirondo Gulf at Lake Victoria killing him and eleven South African officers and men, including Colonel Frederick Theron, Lt. Col. Eric Vickers Frykberg and Lt. Col. Eric Loftus Mackenzie. The plane crashed 16 km (9.9 mi) from the airfield at Kisumu when a combination of pilot fatigue and an electrical fault in the undercarriage which could not be raised, resulted in a loss of speed and failure to maintain height and it flew into the water. He was survived by his wife Norma and his children: Nelia, Barry and Fay.

Pienaar was one of South Africa's most charismatic and popular military commanders. An infantry regiment, the exhibition hall at the South African National Museum of Military History and a suburb of his home town, Bloemfontein, were later named after him.

Sam Brewer, war correspondent for the Chicago Tribune, wrote in an obituary that Pienaar was "acknowledged by all the military authorities...as one of the best fighting leaders the British have found in this war. He was every inch a soldier and a man, and on top of that had a quality not always found in a tough general—he was loved like a father by his men. . . . More than once he had hard words with higher authorities when he thought insufficient attention was being paid to the safety and comfort of the footsloggers who were bearing the brunt of the fight. Two points struck everybody who met Dan Pienaar—first his disregard for personal danger; second his solicitude for his men."

Numerous streets throughout South Africa have been named after him, including: Aliwal North, Port Elizabeth and Queenstown in the Eastern Cape; Nelspruit, Middelburg and Volksrust in Mpumalanga; Bloemfontein and Ladybrand in the Free State; Thaba Tshwane military base in Pretoria, Centurion East, Florida North and Florida Hills in Gauteng; Stellenbosch in the Western Cape;

== See also ==
- 1st Infantry Division (South Africa)
- East African Campaign (World War II)
- Western Desert campaign

== Sources ==
- Pollock, A. M. Pienaar of Alamein. Cape Times.
- Hartshorn, Eric P. Avenge Tobruk. Cape Town: Purnell & Sons, 1960.
- Militaria—Official Professional Journal of the SADF (Vol 12/2: 1982)
- Eric Rosenthal, General Dan Pienaar – his Life and his Battles. Unie-Volkspers Beperk, Cape Town, 1943, pp. 3, 170

Military offices
Unknown	OC Orange Free State Command; 4 January 1935 – January 1937	Unknown
Preceded by George Brink	OC 1st South African Division; 1942 – ?	Unknown
Unknown	OC 1st South African Infantry Brigade; 1940 – 1941	Unknown
