= 5th Infantry Brigade (South Africa) =

5th South African Infantry Brigade
- Active: 13 Aug 1940 – 24 Nov 1941
- Disbanded: Destroyed by Axis forces at Sidi Rezegh: 24 Nov 1941. Officially disbanded 1 Jan 1943
- Country: South Africa
- Allegiance: Union of South Africa
- Branch: South African Army
- Type: Infantry
- Size: Brigade
- Engagements: East African Campaign; North African Campaign; Operation Crusader

Commanders
- Commander November 1941: Brigadier Bertram Frank Armstrong

The 5th South African Infantry Brigade was an infantry brigade of the army of the Union of South Africa during World War II. The Brigade formed part of the South African 1st Infantry Division and was formed on 13 August 1940. It served in East Africa and the Western Desert and was disbanded on 1 January 1943.

== Order of battle ==
=== East Africa ===
Officer Commanding: Brigadier Bertram Frank Armstrong (Note: Armstrong was captured at Sidi Rezegh on 23 or 24 November 1941 and was flown directly from North Africa to Germany for interrogation. Matthews, D. Capt. With the 5th South African Infantry Brigade at Sidi Rezegh. South African Military History Journal – Vol 10 No 6.)

- 1st South African Irish Regiment
- 2nd Regiment Botha
- 3rd Transvaal Scottish Regiment
- No. 1 S.A. Armoured Car Company
- 5th Field Company, SA Corps of Engineers
- 11th Field Ambulance, SA Medical Corps
- No. 3 Mobile General Workshops, SA Technical Services Corps
- 1 Brigade Signals Company, SA Corps of Signals

=== Western Desert ===
The 5th Brigade was almost totally wiped out by the German 15th Panzer and Italian Ariete Divisions at Sidi Rezegh on 23 November 1941. Although receiving some replacements and being re-equipped, the Brigade never served operationally after this defeat.

== Bibliography ==
- Agar-Hamilton, J.A.I. & Turner, L.F.C. The Sidi Rezeg Battles: 1941. 1957, Oxford University Press, Cape Town.
- Orpen, N. East Africa and the Abyssinian Campaigns: South African Forces World War II: Volume I. 1968, Purnell, Cape Town.
