= Daniel Pinard =

Canadian radio and television presenter (1942–2024)

- Born: 1942
- Died: 2 October 2024 (aged 81–82); Montreal, Quebec, Canada
- Occupations: Radio presenter, television presenter, author

Daniel Pinard (1942 – 2 October 2024) was a Canadian radio and television presenter and author.

== Biography ==
Born in 1942, Pinard's father was politician Roch Pinard. An open homosexual, Pinard outwardly made jokes about his sexual orientation and defended LGBTQ+ rights. His career in media spanned from the 1970s to the 2000s.

Pinard died of a pulmonary embolism at the Centre hospitalier de l'Université de Montréal, on 2 October 2024.

== Mediography ==
=== Television ===
- Le 60 (Ici Radio-Canada Télé, 1975–1977)
- Télémag (Ici Radio-Canada Télé, 1977–1981)
- Consommaction (Télé-Québec, 1992–1995)
- Fleurs et jardins (TVA, 1995–?)
- Ciel, mon Pinard! (Télé-Québec, 1998–2000)
- Les pieds dans les plats (Télé-Québec, 2000–2002)
- Jean-Louis Millette, portrait d'un comédien
- Du cœur au ventre (Ici Radio-Canada Télé, 2007–2009)

=== Radio ===
- Bonjour Montréal
- Puisqu'il faut se lever (CHMP-FM)

=== Books ===
- Pinardises: Recettes et propos culinaires (1994)
- Encore des Pinardises (2000)
