= Peter Pienaar =

Fictional character

Peter Pienaar is a character from John Buchan's series of Richard Hannay books. He is described by Hannay as being "five foot ten, very thin and active, and as strong as a buffalo [with] pale blue eyes, a face as gentle as a girl's, and a soft sleepy voice."

== About ==
The origins of Pienaar's character and person in the Richard Hannay novels are that Pienaar is a 'white hunter' and sometime "ne'er-do-well" whom Hannay met during his time spent in South Africa as a mining engineer, some time before World War I. They formed a very strong bond of comradely friendship forged in moments of extreme danger.

Pienaar appears in the following "Richard Hannay" novels: Greenmantle, The Island of Sheep, and Mr Standfast.

== Plots ==
In Greenmantle, Pienaar aids Hannay as an agent who deceives the German authorities in 1915 about the intentions and inclinations of Afrikaners towards the British Empire, and about how important the Middle East is to British interests. Pienaar plays, while unauthorised and gallivanting in Imperial Germany, a slightly deranged but anti-British Boer, who only wants to do harm to the British Empire out of revenge for wrongs done to his people during the Anglo-Boer war (the Second South African War). He is re-united with Hannay by chance at a harbour on the Danube, on the way to Constantinople, the capital of the Ottoman empire.

Near the end of the novel Mr Standfast, Pienaar - who joined the Royal Flying Corps in 1916 and become something of an "ace" and a hero to the younger pilots although modest and self-effacing as a man, is killed in an aerial collision during an heroic battle with the German air ace "Lensch" (also portrayed by Buchan as a chivalrous and honourable enemy, for Pienaar met him while in brief captivity previous to this story, and Lensch saw to his well-being). Lensch, leading a flight of fighter/observers, is carrying back to the German lines the secret of the terrible vulnerability of the Allied lines at that point in early 1918. The event is witnessed by General Richard Hannay on the ground, in his trench lines, a short distance away.

Pienaar is buried in the last scene of Mr Standfast, in which Richard Hannay, in the presence of Mary Lamington and John S. Blenkiron, reads the valediction for "Mr Valiant-for-Truth" (from "Pilgrim's Progress") instead of that for Mr Standfast: as Hannay believes that Pienaar earned that greater salute for his bravery than what he would have otherwise warranted. Pienaar is awarded the VC posthumously, for his action.

The reference to "Mr Standfast", a character from John Bunyan's Pilgrim's Progress, is because Pienaar is stated as often comparing himself to that fictional character.

The plot of The Island of Sheep arises from an incident in South Africa involving Hannay and Pienaar. Pienaar inspires Hannay's character based disguises in The 39 Steps.
