= Ciel, mon Pinard! =

Canadian cooking show

Ciel, mon Pinard! was a very popular Quebec cooking show on Télé-Québec with Daniel Pinard as main chef and Josée Di Stasio as assistant. While many kitchen shows tend to be formulaic, the success of this programme was in its offbeat, poetic digressions of the knowledgeable Pinard. The show was a springboard for Di Stasio, who went off to star in her own cooking show, À la Di Stasio, after Pinard left the programme. The title is a pun on the legendary line "Ciel, mon mari!" (Heavens, my husband!) from the plays of French playwright Georges Feydeau.

== See also ==
- List of Quebec television series
- Television of Quebec
- Cuisine of Quebec
- Culture of Quebec
