= South African Army order of battle 1940 =

South African Army
- Active: 3 September 1939 – July 1940
- Country: South Africa
- Defence Headquarters: Pretoria, Transvaal

This page details the South African Army order of battle in 1940, before and after the formation of expeditionary forces.

== South African Army – 3 September 1939 – July 1940 ==
Defence Headquarters: Pretoria, Transvaal

=== Cape Command ===
HQ The Castle, Cape Town, Cape Province

- A. Permanent Force
  - Cape Detachment, The Special Service Battalion: Cape Town
    - No. 1 Anti-Aircraft Artillery Battery: Bamboevlei, Wynberg (Note: South African Permanent Force and University of Cape Town Active Citizen Force)
  - The Coast Artillery Brigade: HQ, The Castle, Cape Town
    - 2 Sections of Cape Garrison Artillery designated as Engineers and Signals: Cape Town
    - 1st Heavy Battery: Cape Town (Note: Composite Battery of Cape Garrison Artillery and South African Permanent Garrison Artillery) (Wynard Battery): Table Bay
    - 2nd Heavy Battery: Simonstown (Queen's Battery): Simonstown
    - 1st Medium Battery: Cape Town
    - 2nd Medium Battery: Cape Town
    - No. 1 Armoured Train: Cape Town (Note: An Active Citizen Force unit with Permanent Force nucleus)
    - The Cape Field Artillery (Prince Albert's Own): Cape Town (Note: An Active Citizen Force unit with Permanent Force nucleus)
- B. Active Citizen Force
  - 3rd Infantry Brigade: HQ Cape Town
    - The Duke of Edinburgh's Own Rifles: Cape Town
    - The Cape Town Highlanders (The Duke of Connaught and Strathearn's Own): Cape Town
    - The Kimberley Regiment: Kimberley
    - 3rd Field Company, South African Engineer Corps: Cape Town
  - 8th Infantry Brigade: HQ Oudtshoorn
    - Regiment Westelike Provinsie: Stellenbosch
    - Regiment Suid-Westelike Distrikte: Oudtshoorn
    - Die Middellandse Regiment: Graff-Reinet
    - 8th Field Company, South African Engineer Corps: Cape Town

=== Eastern Province Command ===
HQ East London, Cape Province

- A. Permanent Force
  - 5th Heavy Battery, South African Permanent Garrison Artillery: East London
  - 6th Heavy Battery, South African Permanent Garrison Artillery: Port Elizabeth
- B. Active Citizen Force
  - 2nd Infantry Brigade: HQ Port Elizabeth
    - The Prince Alfred's Guard: Port Elizabeth
    - The Kaffrarian Rifles: East London
    - The First City: Grahamstown
    - 2nd Field Company, South African Engineer Corps: Uitenhage
    - Die Middellandse Regiment (See 8th Infantry Brigade)

=== Natal Command ===
HQ Durban, Natal

- A. Permanent Force
  - Royal Durban Light Infantry Company, The Special Service Battalion: Durban
  - 3rd Heavy Battery, South African Permanent Garrison Artillery: Durban Beach
  - 4th Heavy Battery, South African Permanent Garrison Artillery: The Bluff, Durban
- B. Active Citizen Force
  - The Natal Field Artillery: Durban
    - 'A', 'B' Batteries: Durban
    - 'C' Battery: Pietermaritzburg
  - 1st Infantry Brigade (South Africa): HQ Pietermaritzburg
    - 1st Royal Natal Carabineers: Pietermaritzburg
    - 2nd Royal Natal Carabineers: Ladysmith
    - The Umvoti Mounted Rifles: Greytown
    - 1st Field Company, South African Engineer Corps: Durban
  - 7th Infantry Brigade: HQ Durban
    - The Natal Mounted Rifles: Durban
    - 1st, 2nd Royal Durban Light Infantry: Durban
    - 7th Field Company, South African Engineer Corps: Durban

=== Orange Free State Command ===
HQ Bloemfontein, Orange Free State

- A. Permanent Force
  - The Pioneer Battalion: Bloemfontein
- B. Active Citizen Force
  - The Oranje Vry Staat Veldartillerie
    - 1ste Batterie: Tempe
    - 2de Batterie: Bethlehem
  - 4th Infantry Brigade: HQ Bloemfontein
    - Regiment de Wet: Kroonstad
    - Regiment Louw Wepner: Ladybrand
    - Regiment President Steyn: Bloemfontein
    - 4th Field Company, South African Engineer Corps: Bloemfontein
  - The Kimberley Regiment (See 3rd Infantry Brigade)

=== Robert's Heights and Transvaal Command ===
HQ Robert's Heights, Transvaal

- A. Permanent Force
  - The Special Service Battalion: Robert's Heights (Note: Less Detachments)
  - The Artillery School: (Note: Including 1st, 2nd Field Batteries, South African Artillery absorbed. Diluted with Active Citizen Force) Robert's Heights
  - The Artillery Depot: Robert's Heights
  - No. 2 Armoured Train, South African Permanent Garrison Artillery: (Note: Active Citizen Force with Permanent Force nucleus) Robert's Heights
- B. Active Citizen Force
  - 1st Field Survey Company, South African Engineer Corps: Robert's Heights
  - 6th Infantry Brigade (HQ Pretoria)
    - 1st, 2nd Pretoria Regiment (Princess Alice's Own): Pretoria
    - Regiment De la Rey: Rustenburg
    - 6th Field Company, South African Engineer Corps: Pretoria

=== Witwatersrand Command ===
HQ Johannesburg, Transvaal

- A. Active Citizen Force
  - The Transvaal Horse Artillery (A, B Batteries): Johannesburg
  - 5th Infantry Brigade: HQ Johannesburg
    - The Imperial Light Horse: Johannesburg
    - 1st, 2nd Transvaal Scottish: Johannesburg
    - 5th Field Company, South African Engineer Corps: Johannesburg
  - 9th Infantry Brigade: HQ Johannesburg
    - The Witwatersrand Rifles: Johannesburg
    - The Rand Light Infantry: Johannesburg
    - Regiment Botha: Morgenson
    - 9th Field Company, South African Engineer Corps: Johannesburg

== The Defence Rifle Associations (Commandos) ==
- The Cape Defence Rifle Association
- The Transvaal Defence Rifle Association
- The Natal Defence Rifle Association
- The Orange Free State Defence Rifle Association

== South African Army 1939–40 ==
=== Active Citizen Force Infantry Battalions and Brigades 1940 ===
- March 1940 – Intended Organization (HQ & Recruiting Areas)
  - 1st South African Infantry Brigade
    - 1st Royal Natal Carabineers – Pietermaritzburg
    - 1st Duke of Edinburgh's Rifles – Cape Town
    - 1st Transvaal Scottish – Johannesburg
  - 2nd South African Infantry Brigade
    - 1st Field Force Battalion – Ladysmith
    - 2nd Field Force Battalion – Ladysmith
    - 1st Natal Mounted Rifles – Durban
  - 3rd South African Infantry Brigade
    - 1st Imperial Light Horse – Johannesburg
    - 1st Royal Durban Light Infantry – Durban
    - 1st Rand Light Infantry – Johannesburg
  - 4th South African Infantry Brigade
    - 2nd Royal Durban Light Infantry – Durban
    - 2nd Natal Mounted Rifles – Greytown (Note: Replaced by The Umvoti Mounted Rifles)
    - The Kaffrarian Rifles – East London
  - 5th South African Infantry Brigade
    - 2nd Regiment Botha – North of Nylstroom
    - 3rd Transvaal Scottish – Benoni
    - 1st South African Irish – Johannesburg
  - 6th South African Infantry Brigade
    - 1st South African Police – Pretoria
    - 2nd South African Police – Pretoria
    - 2nd Transvaal Scottish – Johannesburg (Note: Replaced The Pretoria Highlanders)
  - 7th South African Infantry Brigade
    - The Pretoria Highlanders – Pretoria
    - 1st Pretoria Regiment – Pretoria
    - The First City – Grahamstown
  - 8th South African Infantry Brigade
    - Regiment De la Rey (Note: South of Nylstroom and west of the railway, excluding Vereeniging)
    - 1st Witwatersrand Rifles – Johannesburg
    - The Cape Town Highlanders – Cape Town
  - 9th South African Infantry Brigade
    - The Prince Alfred's Guard – Port Elizabeth
    - Regiment President Steyn – Bloemfontein
    - Regiment Westelike Provinsie – Stellenbosch
  - 10th South African Infantry Brigade
    - The Kimberley Regiment- Kimberley
    - Regiment South Westelike Distrike – George
    - 1st Regiment Botha – South of Nylstroom
  - 11th South African Infantry Brigade
    - 2nd Witwatersrand Rifles – Springs
    - 1st South-West African Infantry Battalion – Windhoek
    - Die Middelandse Regiment – Graff-Reinet
  - 12th South African Infantry Brigade
    - 2nd Royal Natal Carabineers – Ladysmith
    - 2nd Pretoria Regiment – Pretoria
    - 2nd Rand Light Infantry – Krugersdorp
  - Others
    - Regiment de Wet – Kroonstaad
    - Regiment Louw Wepner – Ladybrand
    - 2nd Natal Mounted Rifles – Greytown
    - 2nd Imperial Light Horse – Johannesburg

=== 1st Reserve Brigade – Raised 29 February 1940 ===
- 1st Battalion (Transvaal) – Raised 29 February 1940 at Johannesburg
- 2nd Battalion (The Cape Peninsular Rifles) – Raised 29 February 1940 at Cape Town
- 3rd Battalion (The Natal Scottish) – Raised 29 February 1940 at Durban
- 4th Battalion (The Witwatersrand Rifles) – Raised 29 February 1940
- 5th Battalion (Eastern Province) – Raised 29 February 1940
- 6th Battalion (Transvaal) – Raised 29 February 1940
- 7th Battalion (Orange Free State and Kimberly) – Raised 1941
- 8th Battalion (Transvaal) – Raised 1941
- 9th Battalion – Raised 1943
- 10th Battalion – Raised 1943
- 11th Battalion – Raised 1943
- 12th Battalion – Raised 1943

=== 1st Mounted Command Division 10 June 1940 – Piet Retief ===
- 1st Field Squadron, SAEC
- 1st Mounted Brigade
  - 1st Mounted Regiment – Formed at Pretoria
  - 2nd Mounted Regiment – Formed in the Transvaal
  - 3rd Mounted Regiment – Formed in the Transvaal
- 2nd Mounted Brigade
  - 4th Mounted Regiment – Formed in Orange Free State
  - 5th Mounted Regiment – Formed in Natal
  - 6th Mounted Regiment – Formed at the Castle, Cape Town, Cape Province

== The Mobilization of the South African Mobile Field Force – 1940 ==
- 1st South African Division – Raised 13 August 1940 at Robert's Heights
  - 3rd Field Brigade, SAA (Transvaal Horse Artillery)
  - 4th Field Brigade, SAA
  - 7th Field Brigade, SAA
  - 1st Anti-Tank Brigade, SAA
  - 1st, 5th, 12th Field Companies, SAEC
  - 19th Divisional Field Park Company, SAEC
  - 1st South African Infantry Brigade (Raised 13 May 1940 at Kafferskraal)
    - 1st Royal Natal Carabineers
    - The Duke of Edinburgh's Own Rifles
    - 1st Transvaal Scottish
  - 2nd South African Infantry Brigade (Raised 13 May 1940 at Premier Mine)
    - 1st, 2nd Field Force Battalions
    - 1st Natal Mounted Rifles
  - 5th South African Infantry Brigade (Raised 16 June 1940 at Barberton)
    - 3rd Transvaal Scottish
    - 2nd Regiment Botha
    - 1st South African Irish Regiment
- 2nd South African Division (Raised 23 October 1940)
  - 1st Field Brigade, SAA (Cape Field Artillery (Prince Alfred's Own))
  - 2nd Field Brigade, SAA (Natal Field Artillery)
  - 5th Light Field Brigade, SAA
  - 2nd Anti-Tank Brigade, SAA
  - 2nd, 4th, 10th Field Companies, SAEC
  - 20th Divisional Field Park Company, SAEC
  - 3rd South African Infantry Brigade (Raised 8 June 1940 at Zonderwater)
    - 1st Imperial Light Horse
    - 1st Royal Durban Light Infantry
    - 1st Rand Light Infantry
  - 4th South African Infantry Brigade (Raised 17 June 1940 at Oribi Camp, Pietermaritzburg
    - 2nd Natal Mounted Rifles (Until October 1940)
    - 2nd Royal Durban Light Infantry
    - The Kaffrarian Rifles
    - The Umvoti Mounted Rifles (From October 1940)
  - 6th South African Infantry Brigade (Raised 17 June 1940 at Pietermaritzburg
    - 1st Pretoria Highlanders (Until November 1940)
    - 1st, 2nd South African Police
    - 2nd Transvaal Scottish (From 21 November 1940)
- 3rd South African Division (Raised 23 October 1940 at Pretoria)
  - 6th Light Field Brigade, SAA
  - 8th, 9th, 10th Field Companies, SAEC
  - 17th Divisional Field Park Company, SAEC
  - 7th South African Infantry Brigade (Raised 11 July 1940 at Premier Mine)
    - 1st Pretoria Regiment
    - 1st Witwatersrand Rifles
    - Regiment De la Rey
  - 8th South African Infantry Brigade (Raised 1 July 1940 in East London. Disbanded November 1940.)
    - The Cape Town Highlanders
    - The First City
    - Prince Alfred's Guard
  - 9th South African Infantry Brigade (Raised 15 July 1940 at Premier Mine)
    - Regiment President Steyn (Until 22/11/40)
    - Die Middelandse Regiment
    - Regiment Westelike Provinsie (Until 1 September 1940)
    - 2nd Pretoria Regiment (From Sep 1940 to Oct 1940)
    - 2nd Transvaal Scottish (From 4 Sep 1940 to 21 Nov 1940)
    - 2nd Royal Natal Carabineers (From 9 Sep 1940 to 3 Oct 1940)
    - 1st Regiment Botha (From Sep 1940 to Nov 1940)
    - 1st Pretoria Highlanders (From Nov 1940)
      - The Cape Town Highlanders (From 6 Nov 1940)
      - 2nd Natal Mounted Rifles (From 23 Nov 1940)
  - 10th South African Infantry Brigade (Raised July 1940. (Note: Replaced 8th Bde in Nov 1940))
    - The Kimberley Regiment
    - 2nd Witwatersrand Rifles
    - The First City Regiment
  - 11th South African Infantry Brigade (Raised July 1940. Disbanded October 1940.)
    - 2nd Witwatersrand Rifles
    - 1st South-West African Infantry Battalion
    - 2nd Imperial Light Horse
  - 12th South African Infantry Brigade (Raised July 1940. Disbanded September 1940.)
    - 2nd Royal Natal Carabineers
    - 2nd Pretoria Regiment
    - 2nd Rand Light Infantry

== See also ==
- List of British Empire divisions in the Second World War
- List of Helmet and Shoulder Flashes and Hackles of South African Military Units
