= List of Helmet and Shoulder Flashes and Hackles of South African Military Units =

Military units in South Africa have a long tradition of using unit insignia to visually identify themselves through the use of helmet and flashes, as well as hackles. This page serves as an informative overview of the various flashes and hackles utilized by different military units in the South African Military. The insignia were predominantly worn from the post-World War I period until approximately 1943, when the use of cloth helmets ceased and were replaced by berets in the Union Defence Force (UDF). These visual symbols represent the identities and histories of each unit and are unique in their design and colors. The page provides detailed descriptions and images of the different flashes and hackles, as well as their origins and meanings.

== Description ==
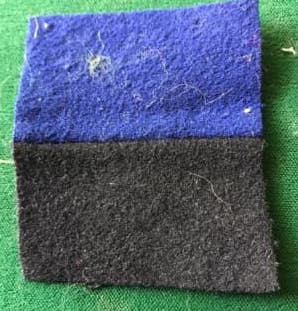
Flash - Natal Infantry in the 1920s and 1930s. Blue on top for Natal and Black on the bottom for Infantry

As a general guide to flashes of the period, the colours had meaning. For Corps/Arm of service, these were, generally, the following:

- Grey - Mounted Units
- Black - Infantry
- Yellow - Artillery

The bottom colour would be the arm of service, the top colour the province.

- Blue - Natal
- Yellow - OVS
- Red - Cape
- Green - Transvaal

== Reserve Force ==
Reserve Force Units
Corps / Unit	From	To	Flash
SA Staff Corps (SAStC)	1912	1920	Flash - South African Staff Corps - 1912 - 1920
SA Staff Corps (SAStC)	1920	1935	Flash - South African Staff Corps - 1920 - 1935
SA Staff Corps (SAStC)	1935	1942	Flash - South African Staff Corps - 1935 - 1942
South African Field Artillery (SAFA)	1923	1935	Flash - South African Field Artillery - 1923 - 1935
South African Garrison Artillery (SAGA)	1923	1935	Flash - South African Garrison Artillery - 1923 - 1935
Artillery Units	1935	1942	Flash - South African Artillery - 1935 - 1942
South African Instructional Corps	1923	1942	Flash - South African Instructional Corps - 1923 - 1942
South African Mounted Riflemen (SAMR)	1922	1926	Flash - South African Mounted Riflemen - 1922 - 1926
Infantry Branch (Citizen Force)	1923	1942	(Note: Black Flash)
Infantry Branch (Citizen Force)	1942	1945	(Note: The "Traverse Bar" (known colloquially as a "balkie") was usually the colours of the helmet flash. The infantry traverse bar was, in this case, actually the colours of the SSB, which were the colours of the National Flag (Orange, White and Blue))
South African Engineers (SAEC)	1923	1928	(Note: White Flash)
South African Engineers (SAEC)	1928	1939	Flash - South African Engineer Corps (SAEC) 1928 - 1939
South African Engineers (SAEC)	1940	1945	Flash - South African Engineer Corps (SAEC) 1940 - 1945
Field Engineers and Signals	1923	1931	Flash - South African Field Engineers and Signals - 1923 - 1931
South African Army Ordnance Corps (SAOC)	1923	1939	Flash - South African Army Ordnance Corps (SAOC) - 1923 - 1931
South African Service Corps (SASC)	1923	1939	Flash - South African Service Corps (SASC) - 1923 - 1939
South African Army Pay & Clerical Corps (SAAP & CC) (Note: Later the Pay Corps part was split off to become just South African Army Pay Corps in 1942 with no distinct flash)	1923	1939	Flash - South African Army Pay & Clerical Corps (SAAP & CC) - 1923 - 1939
Technical Services Corps (TSC)	1939	1942	Flash - Technical Services Corps (TSC) - 1939 - 1942
Technical Services Corps (TSC)	1942	1945	Flash - Technical Services Corps (TSC) - 1942 - 1945
Quartermaster Services Corps (QSC)	1939	1942	Flash - Quartermaster Services Corps (QSC) - 1939 - 1942
South African Medical Corps (SAMC)	1923	1942	Flash - South African Medical Corps (SAMC) - 1923 - 1942
South African Veterinary Corps (SAVC)	1923	1942	Flash - South African Veterinary Corps (SAVC) - 1923 - 1942
South African Corps of Signals (SACS)	1923	1942	Flash - South African Corps of Signals (SACS) - 1923 - 1942
South African Corps of Signals (SACS)	1942	1945	Flash - South African Corps of Signals (SACS) - 1942 - 1945
South African Corps of Military Police (SACMP)	1939	1942	Flash - South African Corps of Military Police (SACMP) - 1939 - 1942
South African Army Band (Note: The SSB band was at the time the de facto Army Band)	_	_	(Note: Hackle or arm flash)
South African Permanent Force Cadets	1920	1939	Flash - South African Permanent Force Cadets - 1920 - 1939
South African Air Force (SAAF)	1920	1942	Flash - South African Air Force (SAAF) - 1920 - 1932

== Active Citizen Force (ACF) ==
Active Citizen Force (ACF) Units
Corps / Unit	From	To	Flash
Cape Field Artillery (CFA)	1923	1939	Flash - Cape Field Artillery (CFA) - 1923 - 1939
Natal Field Artillery (NFA)	1923	1939	Flash - Natal Field Artillery (NFA) - 1923 - 1939
Transvaal Horse Artillery (THA)	1904	1939	Flash - Transvaal Horse Artillery (THA) - 1904 - 1939
1 Oranjie Vrystaat Veld Artillerie (Note: 1 Orange Free State Field Artillery) (1OVSVA) (Note: 6 Field Regiment (Bloemfontein))	1926	1926	Flash - 1 Oranjie Vrystaat Veld Artillerie (1OVSVA) - 1926
2 Oranjie Vrystaat Veld Artillerie (Note: 2 Orange Free State Field Artillery) (2OVSVA)	1926	1926	Flash - 2 Oranjie Vrystaat Veld Artillerie (2OVSVA) - 1926
Cape Garrison Artillery (CGA)	1923	1939	Flash - Cape Garrison Artillery (CGA) - 1923 - 1939
Cape Town - 1 Medium Battery	1934	1939	Flash - Cape Town - 1 Medium Battery - 1934 - 1939
Armoured Train (Cape)	1934	1939	Flash - Armoured Train (Cape) - 1934 - 1939
Armoured Train (Transvaal)	1935	1939	Flash - Armoured Train (Transvaal) - 1934 - 1939
Royal Natal Carbineers (RNC)	1923	1942	Flash - Royal Natal Carbineers (RNC) - 1923 - 1942
Natal Mounted Rifles (NMR)	1923	1940	(Note: The Numeral 3 was white metal, not sewn or embroidered)
Natal Mounted Rifles (NMR) (Note: This Sea Green flash was for the NMR/SAAF amalgamated unit. Amalgamation was to bring up severely depleted numbers)	1940	1943	Flash - Natal Mounted Rifles (NMR) - 1940 - 1943
Umvoti Mounted Rifles (UMR)	1923	1942	Flash - Umvoti Mounted Rifles (UMR) - 1923 - 1942
Imperial Light Horse (ILH)	1905	1942	Flash - Imperial Light Horse (ILH) - 1905 - 1942
Imperial Light Horse (ILH)	1942	1942	Flash - Imperial Light Horse (ILH) - 1942
Royal Durban Light Infantry (RDLI)	1923	1942	Flash - Royal Durban Light Infantry (RDLI) - 1923 - 1942
Duke of Edinburgh's Own Rifles (DEOR) DHQ (Note: DHQ Pattern) (Note: Never worn)	-	-	Flash - Flash - Duke of Edinburgh's Own Rifles (DEOR) - DHQ
Duke of Edinburgh's Own Rifles (DECOR)	1902	1942	Flash - Flash - Duke of Edinburgh's Own Rifles (DEOR) - 1902 - 1942
Prince Alfred's Guard (PAG)	1902	1942	Flash - Prince Alfred's Guard - 1902 - 1942
First City Regiment (FC)	1924	1935	Flash - First City Regiment - 1924 - 1935
Kaffrarian Rifles (Kaff R)	1923	1942	Flash - Kaffrarian Rifles (Kaff R) - 1923 - 1942
Kimberley Regiment (KR)	1923	1942	Flash - Kimberley Regiment (KR) - 1923 - 1942
Cape Peninsula Rifles (CPR) (Note: This was a Reserve unit and neither CF nor ACF)	1914	1926	Flash - Cape Peninsula Rifles (CPR) - 1914 - 1926
Witwatersrand Rifles (WR)	1923	1942	Flash - Witwatersrand Rifles (WR) - 1923 - 1942
Rand Light Infantry (RLI)	1923	1942	Flash - Rand Light Infantry (RLI) - 1923 - 1942
Rand Light Infantry (RLI)	1942	1942	Flash - Rand Light Infantry (RLI) - 1923 - 1942 - Traverse Bar
Pretoria Regiment (PR)	1923	1926	Flash - Pretoria Regiment (PR) - 1923 - 1926
Pretoria Regiment (PR)	1926	1942	Flash - Pretoria Regiment (PR) - 1926 - 1942
Pretoria Regiment (PR) (Note: Pretoria Regiment wore a very distinctive Traverse Bar (Red & Yellow) below a very distinctive badge Backing. Also, the 1st Battalion at the beginning of the war wore a arm patch)	1942	1942	Flash - Pretoria Regiment (PR) - 1942 - Traverse Bar
Regiment Botha (RB)	1934	1942	Flash - Regiment Botha (RB) - 1934 - 1942
Regiment de la Rey (RDLR)	1934	1942	Flash - Regiment de la Rey (RDLR) - 1934 - 1942
Regiment De Wet (RDW)	1934	1939	Flash - Regiment De Wet (RDW) - 1934 - 1939
Regiment Louw Wepner (RLW)	1934	1939	Flash - Regiment Louw Wepner (RLW) - 1934 -1939
Regiment President Steyn (RPS)	1934	1942	Flash - Regiment President Steyn (RPS) - 1934 - 1942
Regiment Suid Westerlike Distrikte (RSWD)	1934	1942	Flash - Regiment Suid Westerlike Distrikte (RSWD) - 1934 - 1942
Regiment Westelike Provincie (RWP) (Note: Regiment Western Province)	1934	1942	Flash - Regiment Westelike Provincie (RWP) - 1934 - 1942
Die Middlelandse Regiment (DMR)	1934	1942	Flash - Die Middlelandse Regiment (DMR) - 1934 - 1942
1 South West Africa Infantry Regiment (SWA1)	1939	1942	Flash - 1 South West Africa Infantry Regiment (SWA1) - 1939 - 1942
Railways and Harbours Brigade HQ (R&H BDE HQ)	1910	1924	Flash - Railways and Harbours Brigade HQ (R&H BDE HQ) - 1910 - 1924
Railways and Harbours Brigade (R&H BDE)	1923	1923	Flash - Railways and Harbours Brigade (R&H BDE) - 1923

== Volunteer Units (1939-1945) ==
Volunteer Units (1939-1945)
Corps / Unit	From	To	Flash	Patch
2nd Mounted Commando Regiment (2 MCR)	1941	1941	Flash - 2nd Mounted Commando Regiment (2 MCR) - 1941	
First City/Cape Town Highlanders Regiment (FC/CTH) (Note: Hackle)	1944	1945	Flash - First City/Cape Town Highlanders Regiment (FC/CTH) (Hackle)- 1944 - 1945	
South African Irish Regiment	-	-	Flash - South African Irish Regiment[ (SA Irish) (Hackle)	
1 TVL BN (1st Res Bde) (Note: 1st Reserve Brigade (1940-1943))	1939	1942	Flash - 1 TVL BN (1st Res Bde) - 1939 - 1942	
2 (CPR) BN (1st Res Bde)	-	-	Flash - 2 (CPR) BN (1st Res Bde) - 1940 -1942	
5 BN (1st Res Bde)	1940	1942	Flash - 5 BN (1st Res Bde) - 1940 - 1942	
6 BN (1st Res Bde)	1940	1942	Flash - 6 BN (1st Res Bde) - 1920 - 1942	Photo of Flash-6 BN (1st Res Bde)-1940-1942
SAEC Survey Company	1940	1945	Flash - SAEC Survey Company - 1940 -1945	
Cape Corps (CC)	1940	1945	Flash - Cape Corps (CC) - 1940 - 1945	
Indian & Malay Corps (I & MC)	1940	1942	Flash - Indian & Malay Corps (I & MC) - 1940 - 1942	
Native military corps (NMC)	1940	1946	Flash - Native military corps (NMC) - 1940 - 1946	

== Divisional Flashes (1940-1945) ==
Divisional Flashes (1940-1945)
Division	From	To	Flash
1st Division	1940	1943	Flash - 1st Division - 1940 - 1943
2nd Division	1940	1943	Flash - 2nd Division - 1940 - 1943
3rd Division	1940	1943	Flash - 3rd Division - 1940 - 1943
6th Armoured Division	1943	1945	Flash - 6th Armoured Division - 1943 - 1945

== See also ==
- South African Army corps and branches
- List of badges of the South African Army
