= GBR =

GBR or GbR may refer to:

== Organisations ==
- GbR (German: Gesellschaft bürgerlichen Rechts), a form of business entity in Germany
- GBR TV, defunct Italian television station
- General Botha Regiment, an infantry regiment of the South African Army
- Great Britain at the Olympics (Team GB), by IOC country code
- Great British Railways, a planned British state-owned railway body

== Places ==
- Great Barrier Reef, off the coast of Queensland, Australia
- Great Bear Rainforest, British Columbia, Canada
- United Kingdom, by ISO 3166-1 alpha-3 code
- Walter J. Koladza Airport (or Great Barrington Airport), United States (by IATA code)

== Science and technology ==
- GBR (subpixels) (Green, Blue, Red), an RGB display pixel layout
- GBR compound, nomenclature code for a series of molecular drugs that are congeners with benztropine
- Gerber format, a file format with extension gbr
- Guaranteed Bit Rate, a characteristic of LTE network traffic flows
- Guided bone regeneration, a medical procedure

== See also ==
- BGR (disambiguation)
- RGB (disambiguation)
