= BGR =

BGR may refer to:

== Organizations ==
- BGR Group, the US lobbying firm co-founded by Haley Barbour
- Boy Genius Report, a technology weblog
- Bundesanstalt für Geowissenschaften und Rohstoffe (Institute for Geosciences and Natural Resources), a Federal Institute of the Federal Republic of Germany

== Places ==
- Bangor International Airport, a joint civil-military public airport west of the city of Bangor, Penobscot County, Maine, United States by IATA airport code
- Bulgaria, by ISO 3166-1 alpha-3 country code

== Science and technology ==
- BGR (subpixels), blue, green, red, an RGB display pixel layout
- Boy Genius Report, a weblog that specializes in technology and consumer gadgets
- Bulletin of Glaciological Research, a peer-reviewed scientific journal

== Other uses ==
- Bob Graham Round, a 24-hour fell-running challenge in the Lake District, England

== See also ==
- GBR (disambiguation)
- RGB (disambiguation)
