= RBG (disambiguation) =

RBG is an abbreviation for Ruth Bader Ginsburg (1933–2020), who was an Associate Justice of the Supreme Court of the United States.

RBG may also refer to:

== Transport ==
- ICAO designator for Air Arabia Egypt, an Egyptian airline
- IATA identifier code for Roseburg Regional Airport, Oregon, United States
- Regental Bahnbetriebs-GmbH, German railway company

== Technology ==
- Random blood glucose, a test for blood sugar
- Random bit generator or random number generator, a term used in computer science
- Rubber band gun, a toy gun used to fire one or more rubber bands

== Other ==
- RBG (film), a 2018 American documentary film about Supreme Court Justice Ruth Bader Ginsburg
- RBG Resources, a British public-limited firm based in London
- RBG: Revolutionary but Gangsta, a 2004 hip-hop album by duo Dead Prez
- Red Barn Gallery, a photography gallery in Belfast, Northern Ireland
- Red, Black and Green, the traditional African colors created by the UNIA
- Rhema Media, a New Zealand Christian media organization previously known as Rhema Broadcasting Group
- Royal Borough of Greenwich, a local authority district in southeast London, United Kingdom
- Royal Botanical Gardens (disambiguation), several Royal Botanic Gardens or Royal Botanical Gardens

== See also ==
- RGB (disambiguation)
