= Durban Light Infantry =

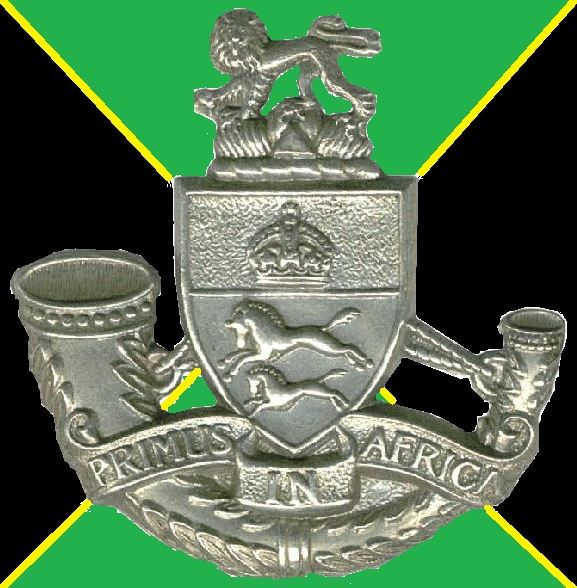
- SANDF Durban Light Infantry emblem
- Active: May 1854 to present
- Country: South Africa
- Allegiance: Union of South Africa; Republic of South Africa
- Branch: South African Army; South African Army
- Type: Infantry
- Role: Motorised infantry
- Size: One battalion
- Part of: South African Infantry Formation; Army Conventional Reserve
- Garrison/HQ: DLI Avenue, Durban 29°50′50″S 31°0′57″E
- Motto: Primus in Africa
- Battle honours: South Africa 1879; South Africa 1899–1902; Relief of Ladysmith; Natal 1906; South West Africa 1914–1915; Western Desert 1941–43; Bardia; Gazala; Alamein Defence; Alamein Box; El Alamein; Italy 1944–45; Casino II; Florence; Gothic Line; Monte Stanco; Monte Pezza; Sole/Caprara; Po Valley

Commanders
- Current commander: Lieut Col Z. Hangana
- Honorary Colonel: Vacant Post

Insignia
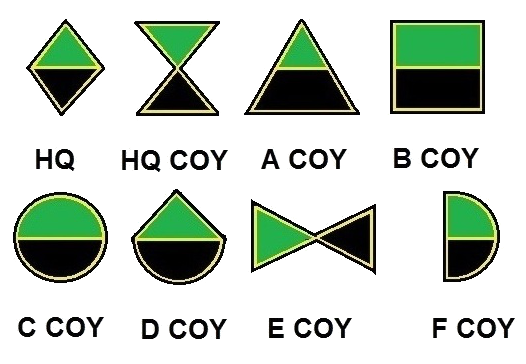
- Company level Insignia

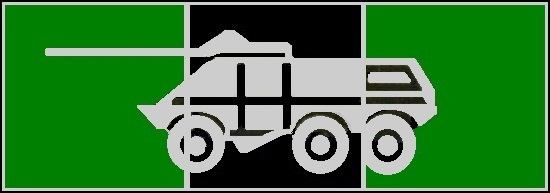
- SA Mechanised Infantry beret bar circa 1992

The Durban Light Infantry is a motorised infantry regiment of the South African Army. It lost its status as a Mechanised infantry regiment in 2010 in line with the rationalisation of resources. As a reserve unit, it has a status roughly equivalent to that of a British Army Reserve or United States Army National Guard unit.

== History ==
The full history of the regiment is recounted in an exhaustive but vivid and readable two-volume history by Lt.Col A.C.Martin, M.C., V.D., B.A.(Cape), Hon Ph.D (Natal). The first volume (368 pages) cover the period 1854-1934, and the second (487 pages) the period 1935-1960. The volumes are illustrated with over 100 photographs and maps.

=== Origin ===
The Regiment was formed as the D’Urban Volunteer Guard, in May 1854. In 1859 the unit became the Durban Rifle Guard. In 1873 the unit became known as the Royal Durban Rifles. In 1889 the unit became known as the Natal Royal Rifles (Left half Battalion). In 1895 it became the Durban Light Infantry.

=== With the Union Defence Force ===
On the constitution of the Union Defence Force in 1912, the Unit became the Durban Light Infantry, renamed the 1st Infantry, (Durban Light Infantry). In consequence the Unit was permitted to add to its badge "Primus in Africa", the motto retained by the unit today in recognition of its foundation.

=== Seniority ===
In 1935, King George V conferred the title Royal on two Regiments being the Royal Durban Light Infantry and the Royal Natal Carbineers, as a recognition of their seniority and service.

In 1961 with the formation of the Republic, the title "Royal" was considered incompatible and the Regiment reverted to being the Durban Light Infantry.

== Regimental Colours ==
At the centre of the 'Regimental Colour' is the badge worn by the Regiment since 1961. It consists of the recognised Infantry Silver Bugle with tassels and a shield with two wildebeest and a crown. The wildebeest are symbolic of the Province, while the crown retained as a traditional device is reminiscent of the title "Royal" bestowed upon the Regiment by King George V in 1935.

The words "Primus in Africa" are superimposed within a scroll.

The crest is composed of a lion passant guardant on three mounds – the centre mound being charged with a pyramid. The lion is symbolic of strength, courage and fortitude. The three mounds are symbolic of the battles fought in World War II – Monte Stanco, Monte Peza and Monte Sole/Caprara. The pyramid is symbolic of the 1941–1943 Egyptian Campaign.

The garland which surrounds the coloured badge comprises the Thistle of Scotland, the Tudor Rose of England and the Shamrock of Ireland – symbols taken from the old colour – and the other two flowers, the Protea, the National flower of South Africa, and the Strelitzia, the flower of Natal (now KwaZulu-Natal).

=== Previous Dress Insignia ===
Durban Light Infantry Crest

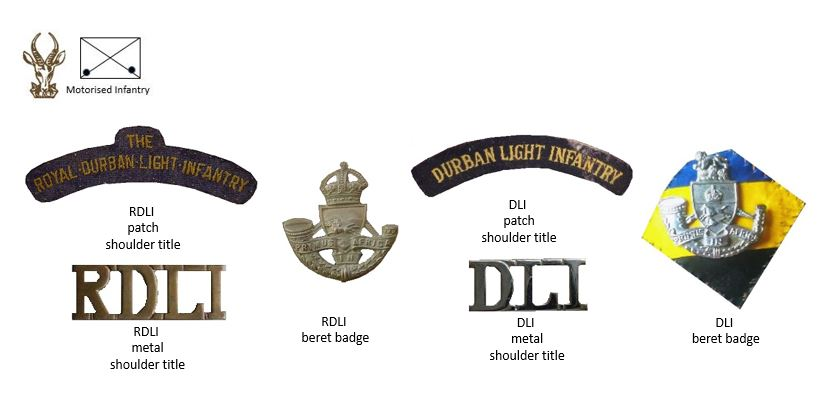
SADF and UDF eras Durban Light Infantry insignia

Helmet Flash - Royal Durban Light Infantry (RDLI) - 1923 - 1942

=== Current Dress Insignia ===
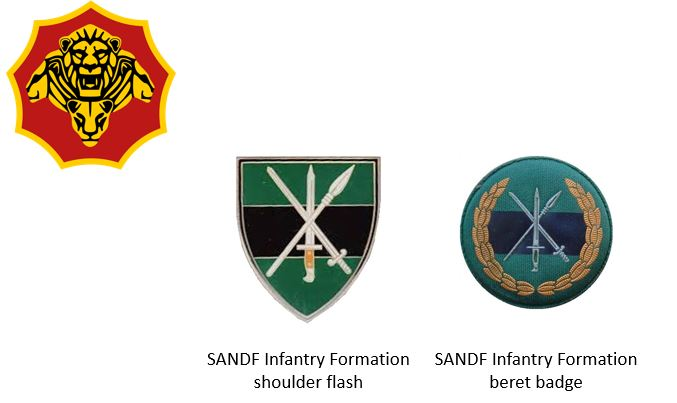
SANDF era Infantry Formation insignia

== Active Service ==
=== Battle Honours ===
Battle Honours
Awarded to Durban Light Infantry
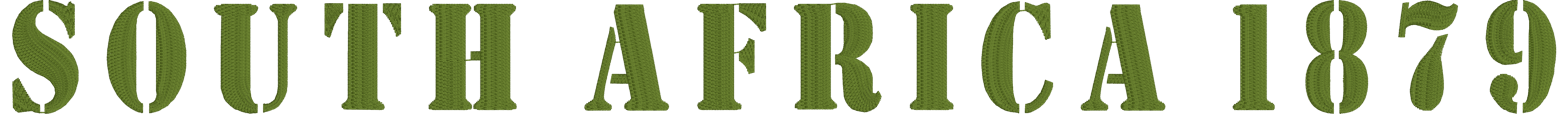
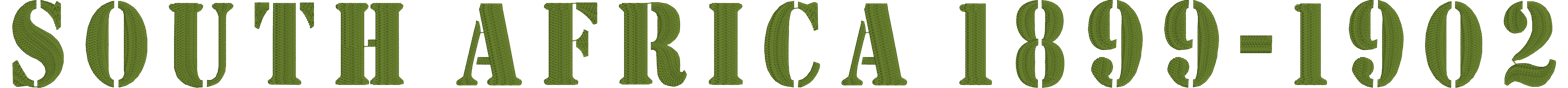
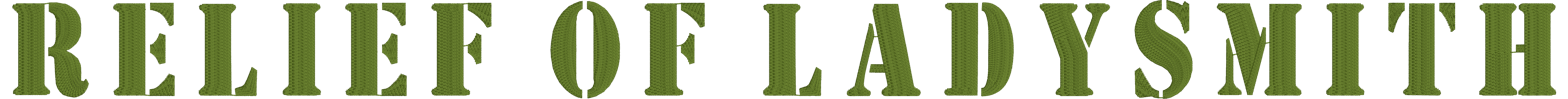
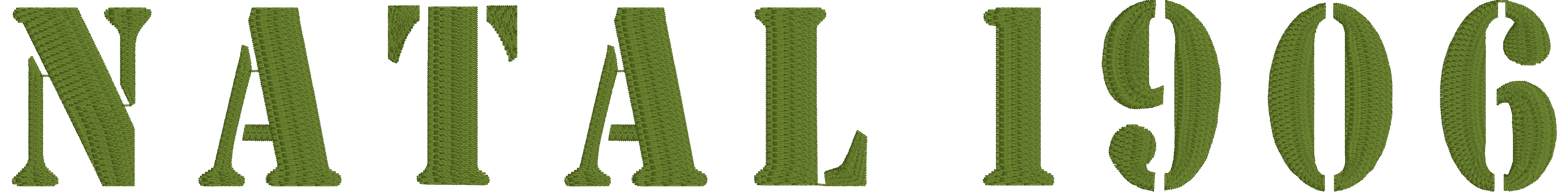
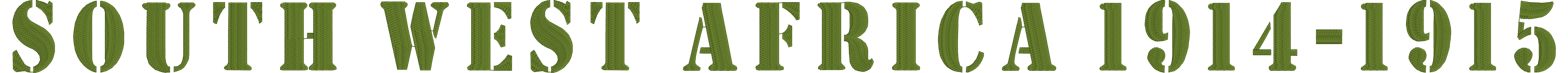
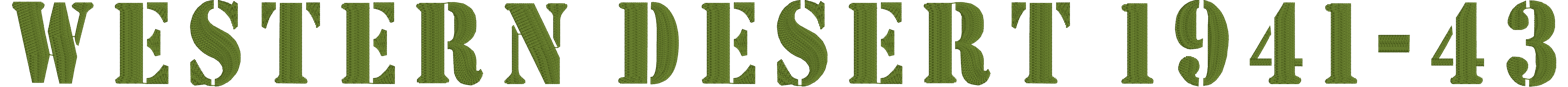
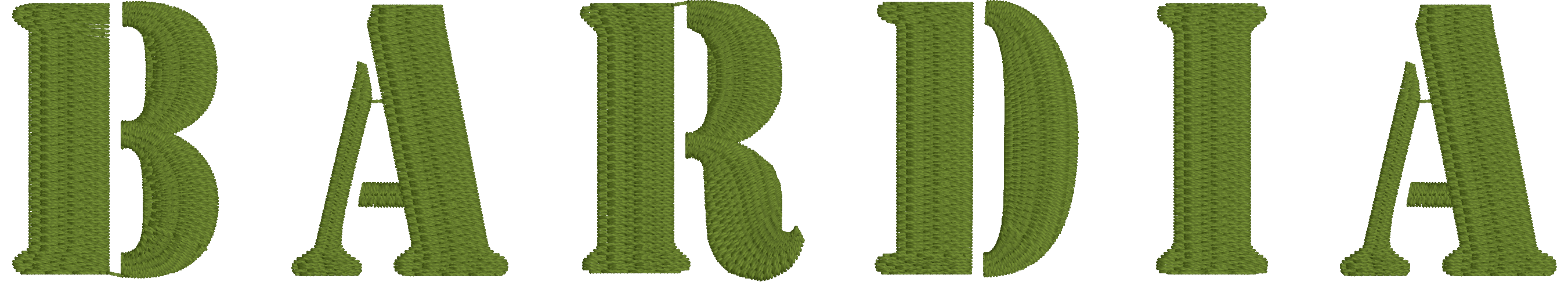
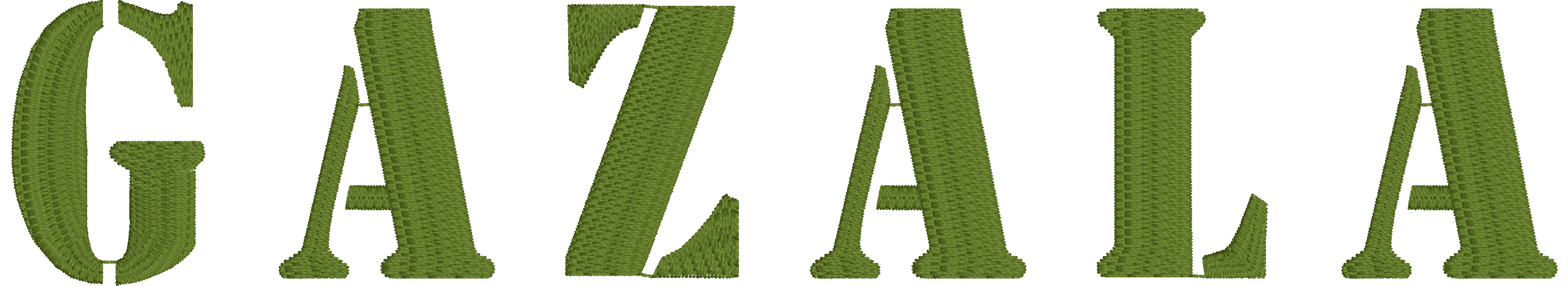
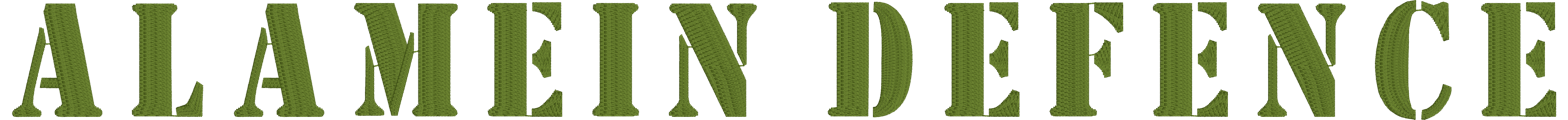
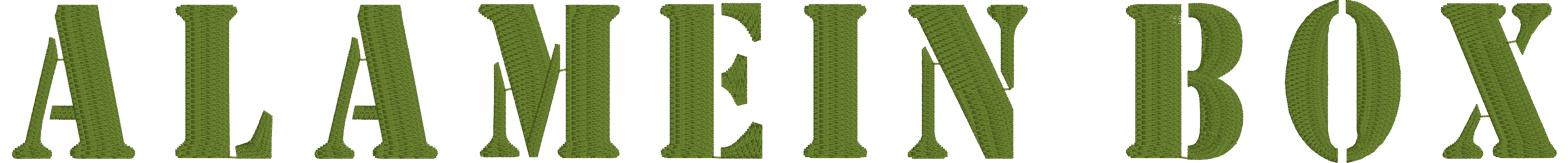
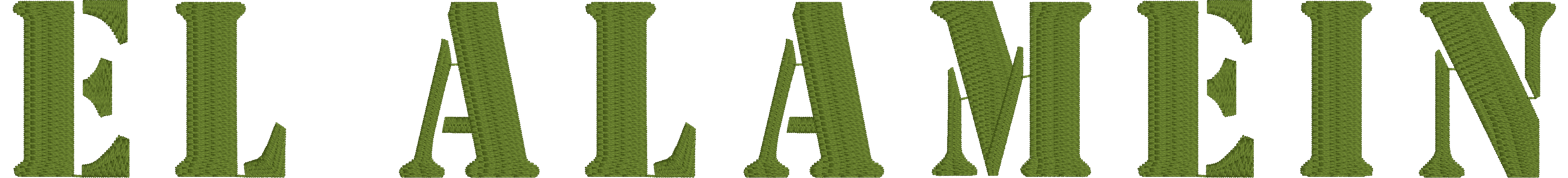
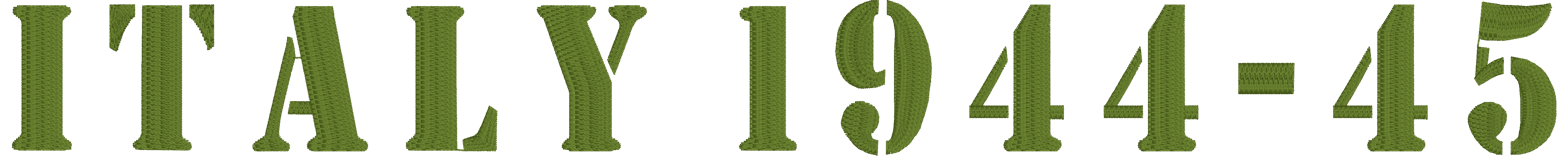
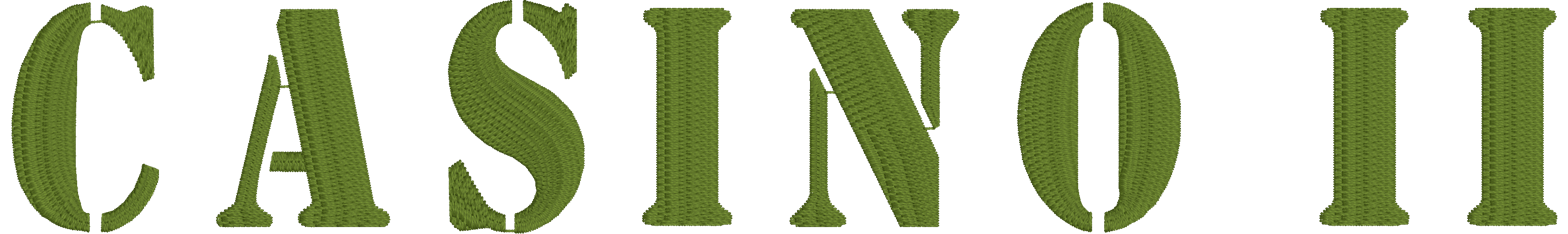
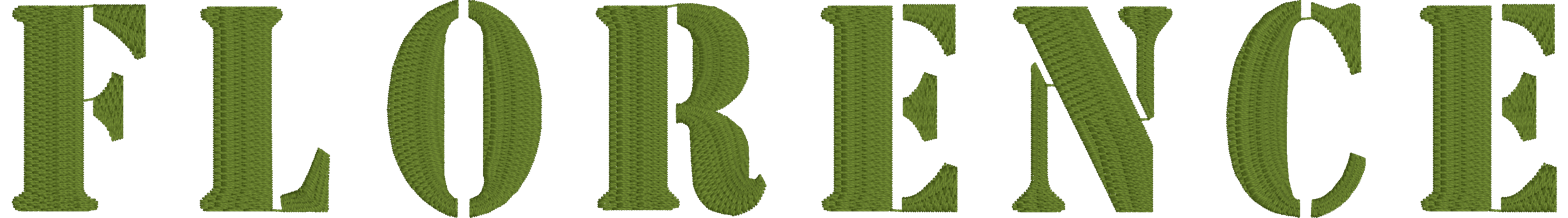
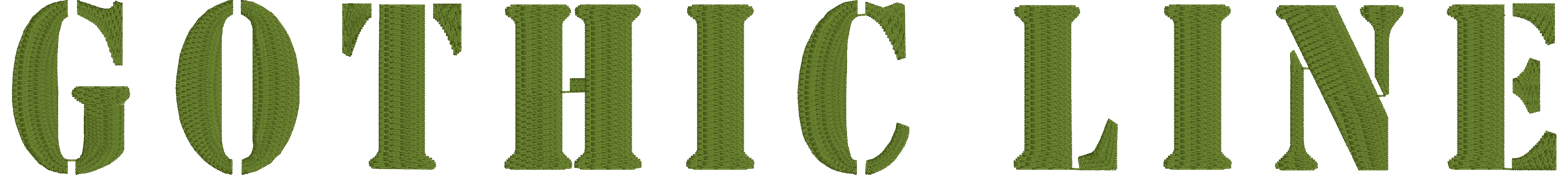
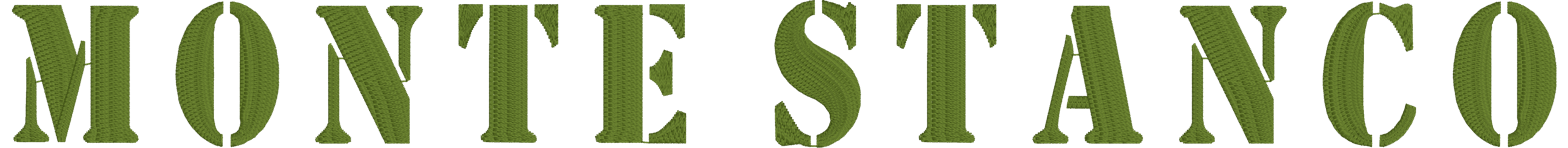
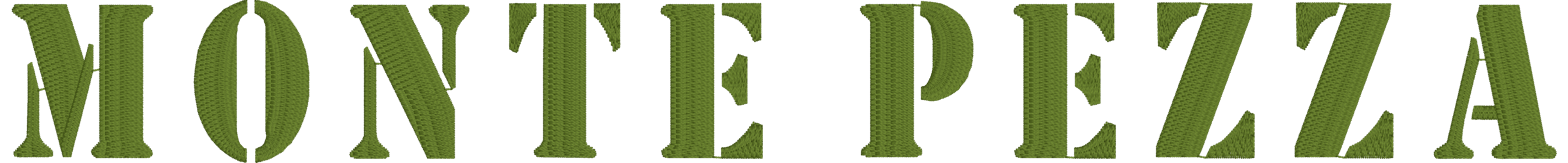
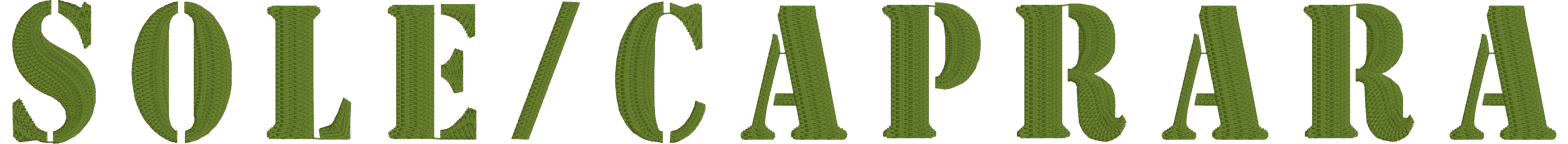
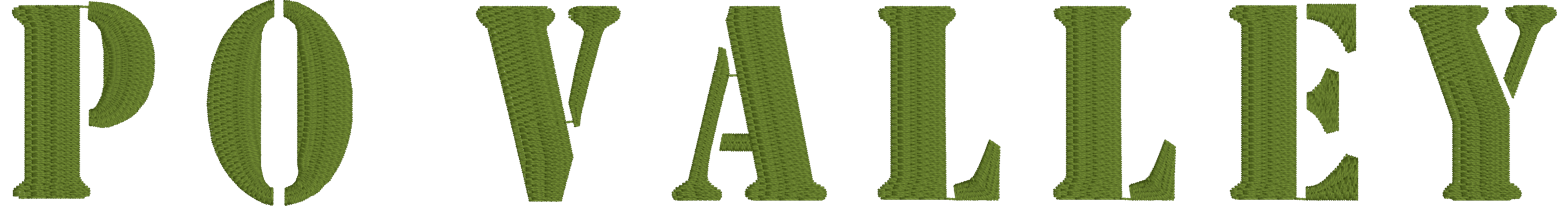

=== Service ===
1. South Africa, Anglo-Zulu War 1879
2. South Africa, Anglo-Boer War 1899–1902
3. Relief of Ladysmith 1900
4. Natal, Bambatha Rebellion 1906
5. South West Africa 1914–1915
6. East Africa 1916–1918
7. Rand Miners' Revolt 1922
8. World War II
  1. Western Desert 1941–1943 (See 1st SA Infantry Division)
  2. Bardia
  3. Gazala
  4. Alamein Defence
  5. Alamein Box
  6. El Alamein
  7. Italy 1944–1945
  8. Casino II
  9. Florence
  10. Gothic Line
  11. Monte Stanco
  12. Monte Pezza
  13. Sole/Caprara
  14. Po Valley
9. South West Africa – Namibia 1976–1994, five tours.
10. Internally in South Africa in support of the SAPS (SA. Police Service) in the following actions;
  1. 1949, 1960, 1961
  2. 1985, 1986, 1987, 1989, 1991, 1992 (mainly rural areas)
  3. 1994 Elections.
  4. 1996 Elections.
  5. 1999 Elections.
11. 2006 Op in Burundi. Detached members to Standing Army control structures.
12. 2007–2014. Internal operations.

== Leadership ==
Leadership
From	Colonels-In-Chief	To	Ribbon
1905	Prince Arthur, Duke of Connaught and Strathearn KG,KT,GCB,GCMG,GCVO,VD,TD (Note: Later Field Marshal) (Note: Later Governor General of Canada)	1938	Order of the Garter KG Order of the Thistle KT Order of the Bath GCB Order of St Michael and St George GCMG Royal Victorian Order GCVO Colonial Auxiliary Forces Officers' Decoration VD Territorial Decoration TD
1947	HM Queen Elizabeth II	1961	
From	Honorary Colonels	To	Ribbon
1903	Maj Gen Sir George Dartnell KCB,CMG	1913	Order of the Bath KCB Order of St Michael and St George CMG
1914	Col the Hon. Sir Matthew Nathan GCMG	1939	Order of St Michael and St George GCMG
1940	Brigadier General GMJ Molyneux DSO,VD	1959	Distinguished Service Order DSO Colonial Auxiliary Forces Officers' Decoration VD
1960	Col C Metcalfe SSA,JCD,ED	2004	Star of South Africa SSA John Chard Decoration JCD Efficiency Decoration (South Africa) ED
2005	Col Errol Richardson	2013	
2013	Awaiting Nomination	Present	
From	Commanding Officers of the Regiment	To	Ribbon
	No known incumbents		
From	OC Durban Volunteer Guard	To	Ribbon
nd	Col , the Hon George Rutherford	nd	
From	OC Durban Rifle Guard	To	Ribbon
nd	Col HJ Meller	nd	
1863	Maj AW Evans	nd	
1866	Capt BW Greenacre	nd	
From	OC Royal Durban Rifles	To	Ribbon
nd	Capt Edward Randles	nd	
1874	Capt William Randles	nd	
1879	Capt PS Flack	nd	
1884	Capt JF King	nd	
1886	Capt T McCubbin	nd	
From	OC Natal Royal Rifles	To	Ribbon
1889	Maj T McCubbin	nd	
1893	Maj HR Bousfield	nd	
From	OC Durban Light Infantry	To	Ribbon
nd	Lt Col T McCubbin MG VD	nd	Colonial Auxiliary Forces Officers' Decoration VD
1902	Lt Col J Scott-Wylie MVO,VD	nd	Royal Victorian Order MVO Colonial Auxiliary Forces Officers' Decoration VD
1914	Col J Scott-Wylie MVO,VD	nd	Royal Victorian Order MVO Colonial Auxiliary Forces Officers' Decoration VD
1914	Lt Col J Dick (Second Battalion) VD	1915	Colonial Auxiliary Forces Officers' Decoration VD
1914	Lt Col RL Goulding (First Battalion) VD	1915	Colonial Auxiliary Forces Officers' Decoration VD
1915	Lieut Col GMJ Molyneux (First Battalion) DSO,VD	nd	Distinguished Service Order DSO Colonial Auxiliary Forces Officers' Decoration VD
1915	Col J Scott-Wylie DSO,MVO,VD	nd	Distinguished Service Order DSO Royal Victorian Order MVO Colonial Auxiliary Forces Officers' Decoration VD
1920	Lt Col GMJ Molyneux DSO,VD	nd	Distinguished Service Order DSO Colonial Auxiliary Forces Officers' Decoration VD
1925	Lieut Col JFR Lauth DSO,VD	nd	Distinguished Service Order DSO Colonial Auxiliary Forces Officers' Decoration VD
1930	Lieut Col CE Borain MC,VD	nd	Military Cross MC Colonial Auxiliary Forces Officers' Decoration VD
From	OC Royal Durban Light Infantry	To	Ribbon
1935	Lt Col CE Borain MC,VD	nd	Military Cross MC Colonial Auxiliary Forces Officers' Decoration VD
1936	Lt Col IW Nolan (First Battalion) VD	nd	Colonial Auxiliary Forces Officers' Decoration VD
1936	Lt Col LGC Bayliss (Second Battalion) VD	nd	Colonial Auxiliary Forces Officers' Decoration VD
1937	Lt Col J Butler-Porter (1/2 Battalion) VD	nd	Colonial Auxiliary Forces Officers' Decoration VD
1940	Lt Col LC Wendt (Second Battalion) VD	nd	Colonial Auxiliary Forces Officers' Decoration VD
1942	Lt Col J Butler-Porter (1/2 Battalion) DSO,VD	nd	Distinguished Service Order DSO Colonial Auxiliary Forces Officers' Decoration VD
1943	Lt Col C Metcalfe (1/2 Battalion) SSA,JCD,ED	nd	Star of South Africa SSA John Chard Decoration JCD Efficiency Decoration (South Africa) ED
1946	Lt Col C Metcalfe (First Battalion) SSA,JCD,ED	nd	Star of South Africa SSA John Chard Decoration JCD Efficiency Decoration (South Africa) ED
1946	Lt Col LC Wendt (Second Battalion) DSO,VD	nd	Distinguished Service Order DSO Colonial Auxiliary Forces Officers' Decoration VD
1947	Lt Col AC Martin (Second Battalion) MC,VD	nd	Military Cross MC Colonial Auxiliary Forces Officers' Decoration VD
1950	Cmdt OS Hampson (Second Battalion) VD	nd	Colonial Auxiliary Forces Officers' Decoration VD
1952	Cmdt C Metcalfe SSA,JCD,ED,VD	nd	Star of South Africa SSA John Chard Decoration JCD Efficiency Decoration (South Africa) ED Colonial Auxiliary Forces Officers' Decoration VD
1952	Cmdt OS Hampson VD	nd	Colonial Auxiliary Forces Officers' Decoration VD
1956	Cmdt G Jaaback VD	nd	Colonial Auxiliary Forces Officers' Decoration VD
1961	Cmdt JH Smallwood JCD	nd	John Chard Decoration JCD
From	Durban Light Infantry	To	Ribbon
c. 1961	Cmdt JH Smallwood SM,JCD	c. 1969	Southern Cross Medal SM John Chard Decoration JCD
1969	Cmdt DN Deavin JCD	nd	John Chard Decoration JCD
1974	Cmdt JJ Hulme JCD	nd	John Chard Decoration JCD
1980	Cmdt MJ Adrain MMM,JCD	nd	Military Merit Medal MMM John Chard Decoration JCD
1984	Cmdt DI Moe SM,MMM,JCD	nd	Southern Cross Medal SM Military Merit Medal MMM John Chard Decoration JCD
1989	Cmdt WJ Olivier SM,MMM,JCD	nd	Southern Cross Medal SM Military Merit Medal MMM John Chard Decoration JCD
1995	Lt Col GPD De Ricquebourg MMM,JCD	nd	Military Merit Medal MMM John Chard Decoration JCD
2004	Lt Col Mark J Whitson MMM,JCD	nd	Military Merit Medal MMM John Chard Decoration JCD
2011	Lieut Col PH Bruyns	nd	
2012	Lt Col SA Mbuyazi (Suspended) (Note: Suspended following allegations of wearing awards and decorations not received & possession of stolen property)	nd	
2012	Lt Col MD Motsamai (Caretaker OC) (Note: Lt Col Motsamai is currently the Commanding Officer of another Reserve Force Unit based in Gauteng)	nd	
nd	Lieut Col Z. Hangana	Present	
From	Regimental Sergeants Major	To	Ribbon
	No known incumbents		
From	Durban Volunteer Guard	To	Ribbon
nd	G Russell	nd	
From	Durban Rifle Guard	To	Ribbon
1861	A Miliett	1862	
1862	T Green	1863	
1863	WK Packman	1864	
1864	A Curle	1866	
1866	W Geere	nd	
From	Royal Durban Rifles	To	Ribbon
1873	AJ Court	1873	
1873	DI Nolan	1876	
1876	SB Kemp	1877	
1877	W Goodal	1880	
1880	J Archibald	1886	
1886	H Hatchell	nd	
From	Natal Royal Rifles	To	Ribbon
nd	A Forbes	nd	
From	Durban Light Infantry	To	Ribbon
1895	RSM A Forbes	1910	
1910	RSM AL Pepper	1913	
1913	RSM A Eales	1914	
1914	RSM A Eales (First Battalion)	1915	
1914	RSM WJ Simpson (Second Battalion)	1915	
1915	RSM A Eales	1926	
1927	RSM G Sime	1931	
1932	RSM PH Johnson	1933	
1933	RSM CA Carlyle	nd	
From	Royal Durban Light Infantry	To	Ribbon
1933	RSM CA Carlyle	1935	
1936	RSM CA Carlyle (First Battalion)	nd	
1942	RSM LPA Boxhall	nd	
1936	RSM JWH McGreavey (Second Battalion)	nd	
1942	RSM LPA Boxhall (1/2 Battalion)	nd	
1943	RSM NJR Punch (1/2 Battalion)	nd	
1946	RSM LPA Boxhall (First Battalion)	nd	
1948	RSM JF Potgieter (First Battalion)	nd	
1946	RSM J.E. Law (Second Battalion)	nd	
1950	RSM W.H. Ward (Second Battalion)	nd	
nd	RSM J.F. Potgieter ED	nd	Efficiency Decoration (South Africa) ED
1956	RSM J.J. Wiliemse	nd	
1957	RSM C. Krause	nd	
1959	RSM A.R. Miles	nd	
From	Durban Light Infantry	To	Ribbon
1962	RSM A.R. Miles JCD	1968	John Chard Decoration JCD
1968	RSM S.M.J. Swanepoel JCD	1974	John Chard Decoration JCD
1974	WO1 R.I. Francis PMM,MMM,JCD	1993	Pro Merito Medal PMM Military Merit Medal MMM John Chard Decoration JCD
1993	WO1 Mark J. Whitson MMM,JCD (Note: later Commanding Officer)	1995	Military Merit Medal MMM John Chard Decoration JCD
1995	WO1 W.J. Smith MMM,JCD	1999	Military Merit Medal MMM John Chard Decoration JCD
2000	WO1 Bobby Freeman JCD (Note: Later RSM of Natal Mounted Rifles)	2005	John Chard Decoration JCD
2005	WO1 Quentin Lategan MMM	2005	Military Merit Medal MMM
2006	WO1 "Ampie" Vorster	2011	
2011	MWO Vilikazi	Present	

== Regimental Headquarters ==
The regimental headquarters of the DLI has been declared as a National Monument.

East Wing of the Drill Hall

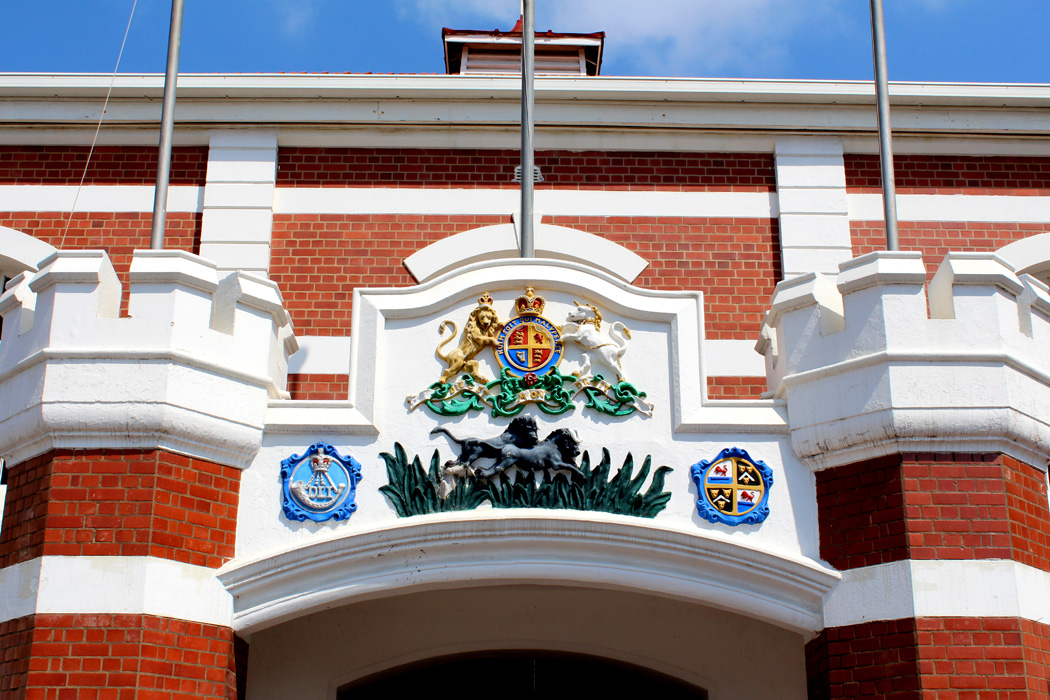
Durban Light Infantry (DLI) HQ entrance detail of logo, Durban

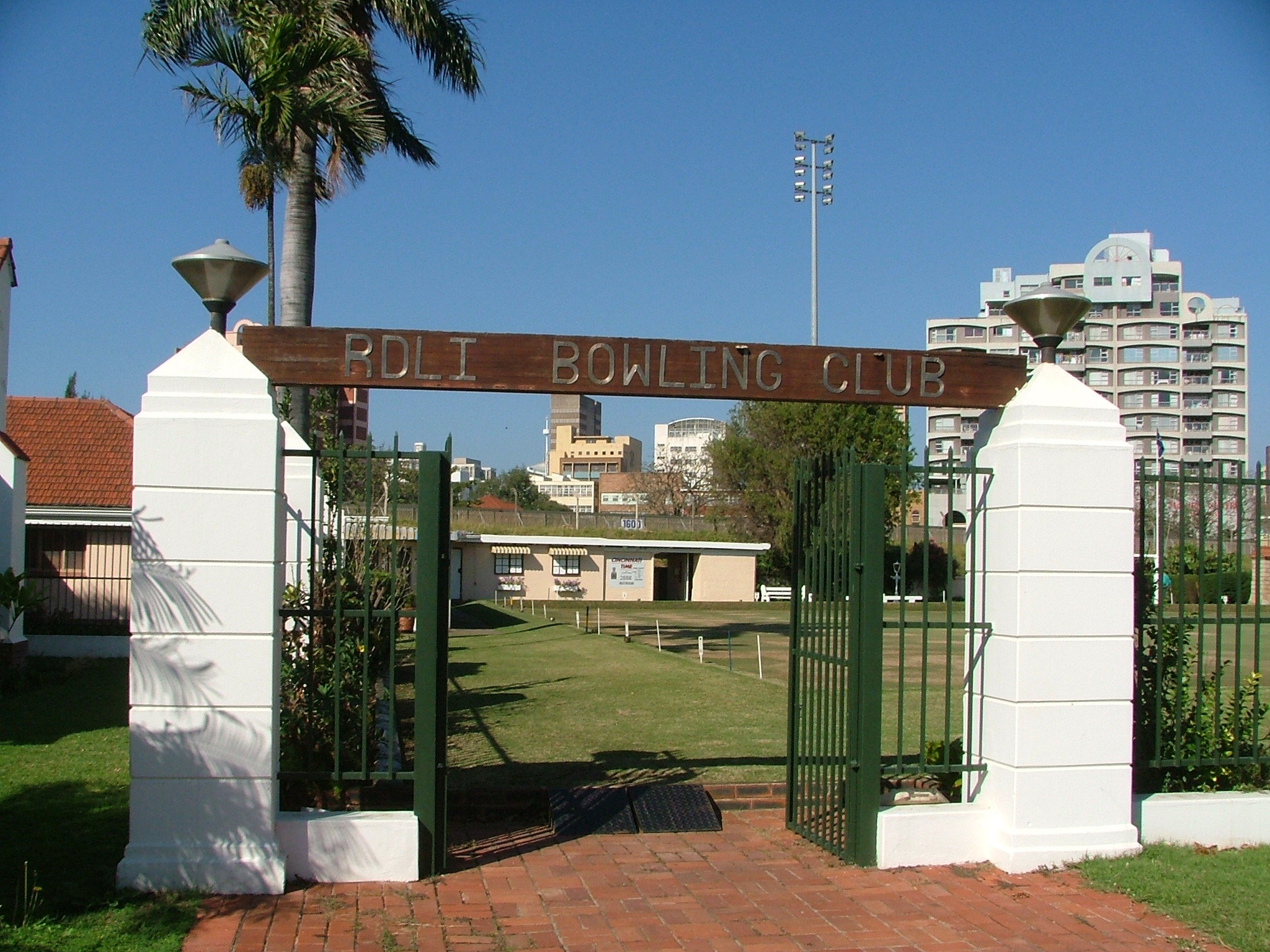
RDLI Bowling Club Entrance

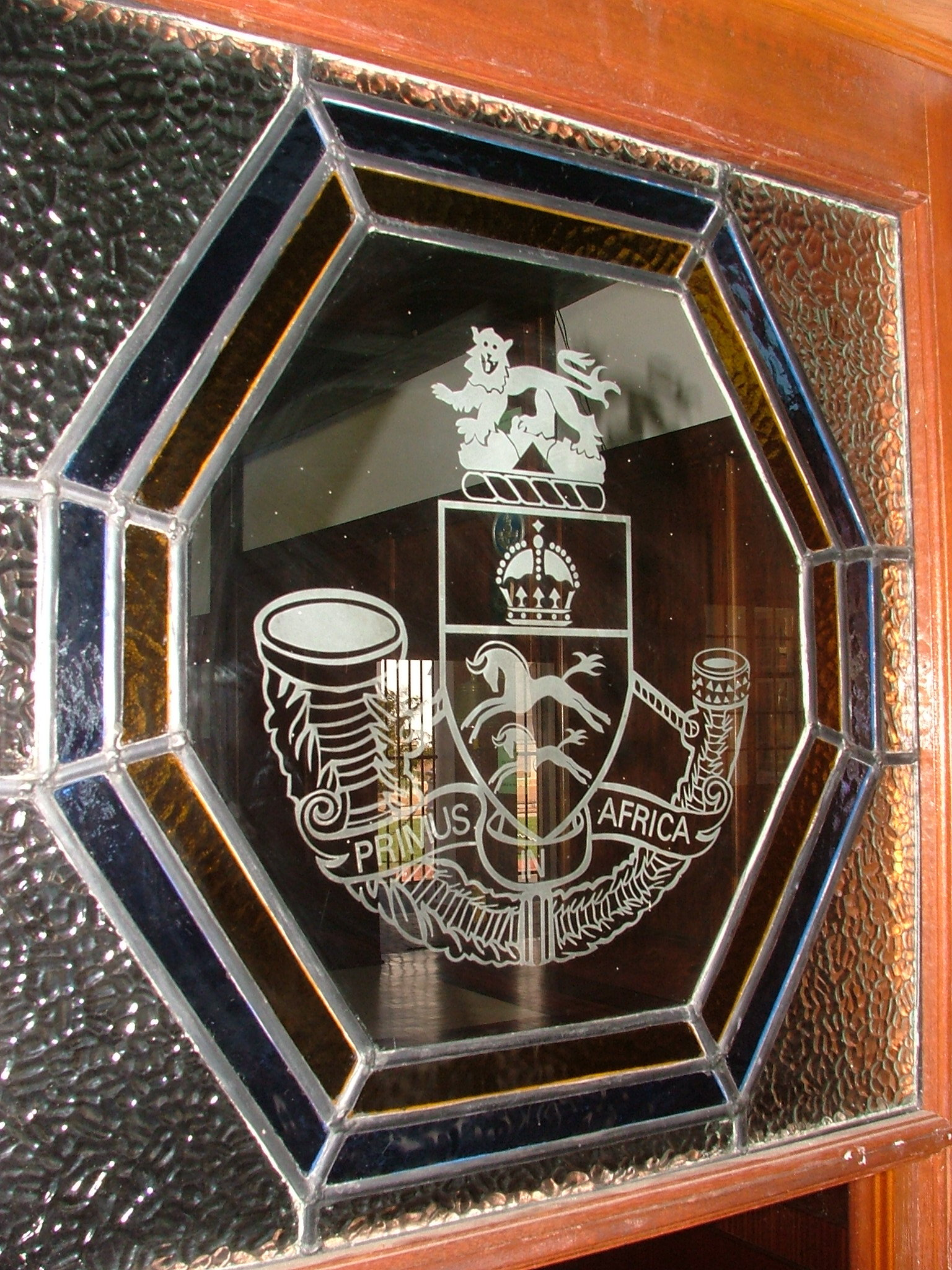
DLI Logo Window - Sgts Mess

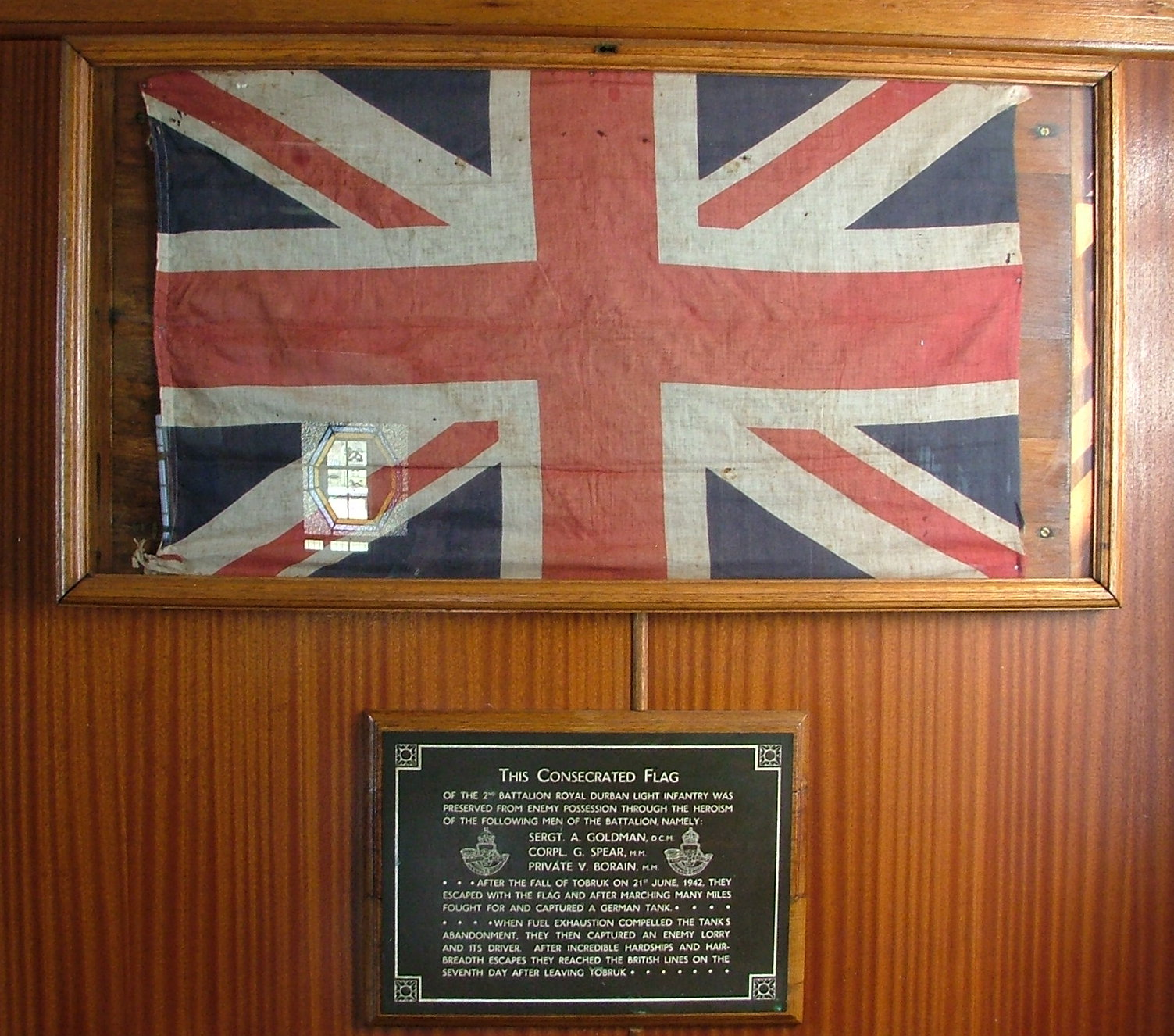
DLI Consecrated Flag

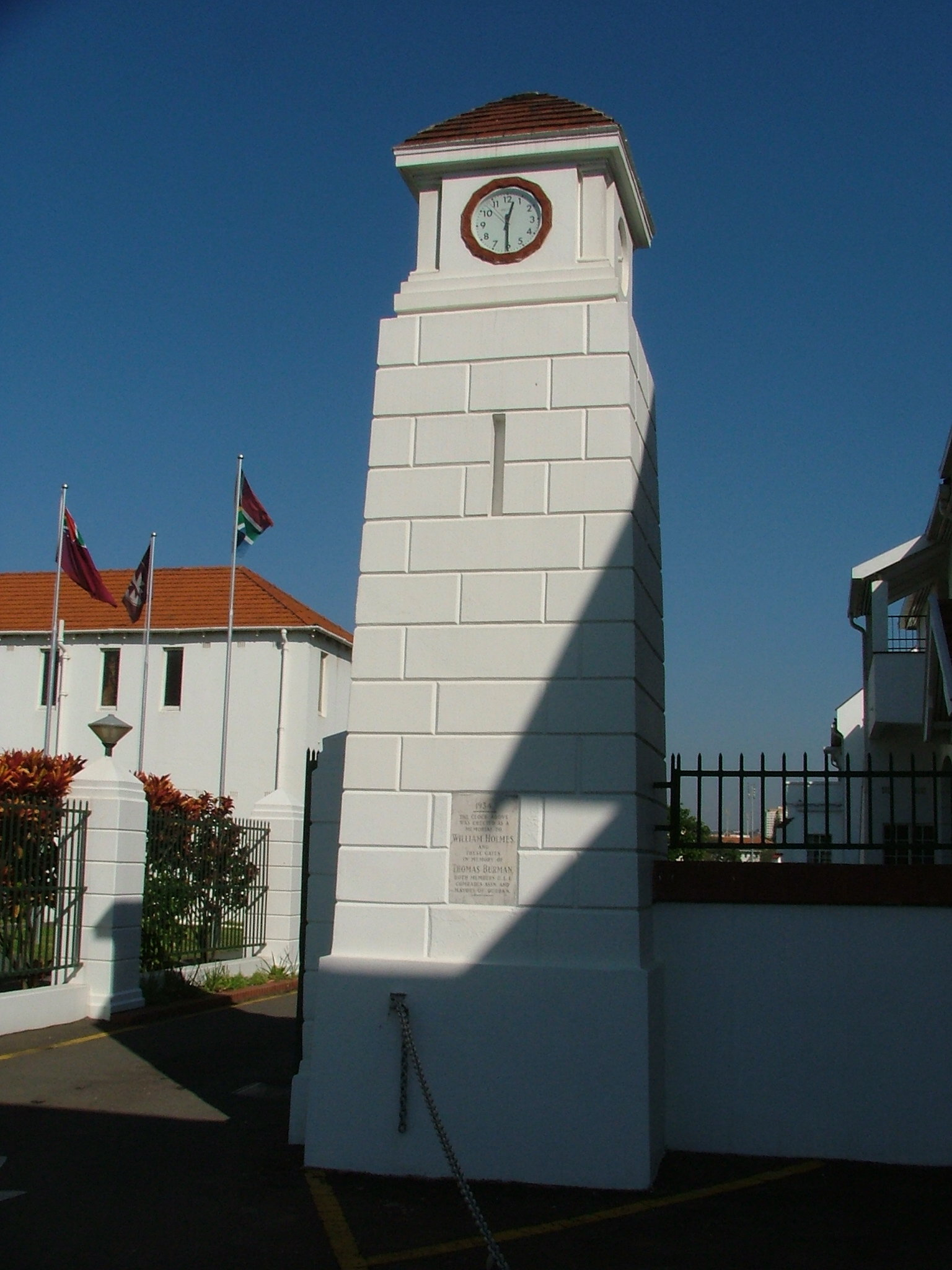
DLI Clock Tower

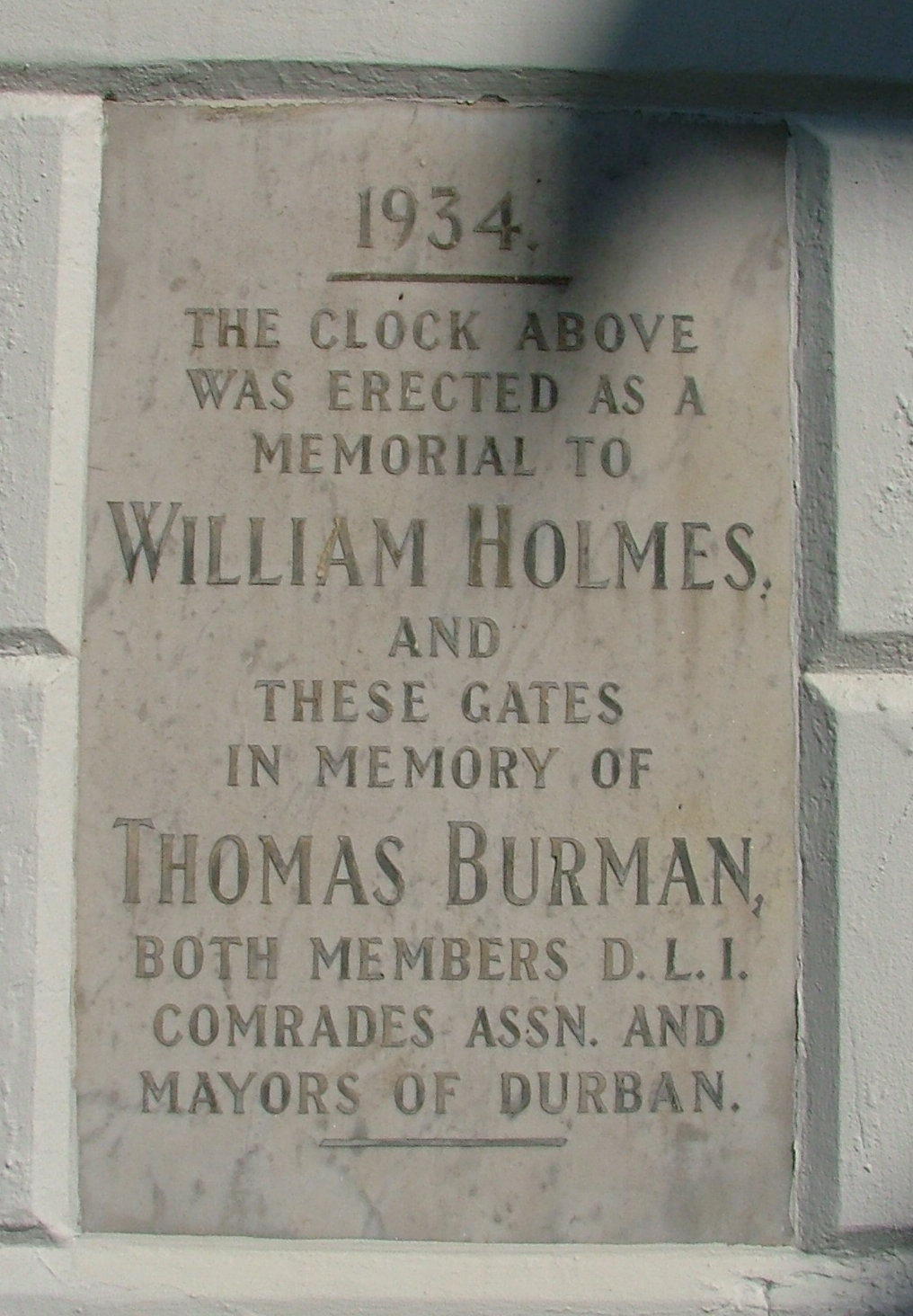
DLI Clock Tower Plaque

== Peacekeeping deployments and training ==
Members of the Regiment have been deployed in Africa, including Burundi and DRC; in support of the United Nations and African Union mandates. The battalion as a whole has not been deployed as a unit for many years, and most of the more recent deployments have been ad hoc with individual members slotting into other unit's ranks.

All members of the Regiment are volunteers, and often have civilian employment. They often endure hardship balancing their military service and civilian employment commitments, especially when they are required to attend lengthy training and courses.

== Regimental history ==
Martin, Lieut Col A.C. MC VD BA (Cape) Hon.PhD (Natal) (1969). Durban Light Infantry: The History of the Durban Light Infantry Incorporating that of the Sixth South African Infantry, 1915 to 1917. DLI Headquarter Board. was published in 1969. It is out of print.

An illustrated history of the 150 years of the Regiment has been prepared by Prof. Brian Kearney, Mr Dave Matthews and Lieut Col "Bill" Olivier SM MMM JCD (Retd.). The book is being sold by the Headquarters Board.

== Affiliations ==
- United Kingdom – The Rifle Brigade 1920
- United Kingdom – The Royal Green Jackets (RGJ) 1966
