= Allied Deals Inc. =

American metal trading company that operated a major Ponzi scheme bank fraud

- Type: Private company
- Industry: Financial services
- Founded: 1989
- Founder: Virendra Rastogi
- Defunct: 2002
- Fate: Closed by law enforcement due to Ponzi scheme fraud
- Headquarters: Piscataway, New Jersey, United States
- Key people: Brothers Narendra and Virendra Rastogi
- Products: Fraudulent trade-brokerage of non-ferrous metals
- Number of employees: 200 (2000)

Allied Deals was an American company specializing in the trade-brokerage of non-ferrous metals and widely acknowledged as one of the biggest cases of Ponzi scheme bank fraud. The scheme collapsed in 2002. 14 people were convicted in the United States, and three in the United Kingdom. This included brothers Narendra and Virendra Rastogi, who controlled the company.

The company, along with affiliates Hampton Lane, SAI Commodity, and RBG Resources, operated a Ponzi scheme in the United States and the United Kingdom on a virtually unprecedented scale, and defrauded approximately 20 banks out of US$683 million. Victims included J.P. Morgan Chase, Fleet National Bank, PNC Bank, KBC Bank, Hypo Vereins Bank, Dresdner Bank, China Trust Bank, and General Bank.

Allied Deals Inc. was based in Piscataway, New Jersey.

== History ==
The Rastogi family started trading metals in India during the 1950s. In the late 1980s, at age 20, Virendra Rastogi founded a New York office of Allied Deals. By 2002, the family was even listed in the London Sunday Times Rich List. Rastogi's younger brother Virendra ran a related company, RBG Resources, based in London.

Allied Deals Inc. established hundreds of sham companies to allegedly trade in non-ferrous metals, and in the process committed a litany of criminal acts, including forging documents, faking credit histories, and impersonation of another person; acting as buyers to the banks.

The scheme collapsed in 2002 with the legal outcome of 15 people arrested and charged in the US. Nine pleaded guilty, five were convicted by jury, and one was acquitted of all charges. Two further defendants are still at large. Three people in the UK were also convicted and found guilty.
