= RGB (disambiguation) =

RGB is an additive color model in which red, green, and blue light is added together in various ways to reproduce a broad array of colors.

RGB may also refer to:

== Technology ==
- RGB color spaces, any additive color space based on the RGB color model
- Analog RGB, a type of video connection
- RGB file format, a raster graphics file format
- RGB lighting, modifications to a computer to add or remove extra hardware

== Other uses ==
- RGB (album), a 2002 album by Akino Arai
- "RGB" (song), a 2021 song by Yoasobi
- Red-giant branch, a type of red giant star
- RGB Entertainment, a production company from Argentina
- Reconnaissance General Bureau, a North Korean intelligence agency
- Ray, Goodman & Brown, an American soul group
- rgb prefix, a Hungarian notation for range of bytes (often used by Win32 APIs)
- Roberto Gómez Bolaños, a Mexican comedy actor
- Rolf-Göran Bengtsson, a Swedish equestrian athlete

== See also ==
- RGBA color model (red, green, blue, and alpha), the RGB color model with an opacity channel
- RBG (disambiguation)
- RPG (disambiguation)
- GBR (disambiguation)
- BGR (disambiguation)
