= Bulletin of Glaciological Research =

- Discipline: Glaciology
- Language: English
- Edited by: Shuji FUJITA

Publication details
- History: 2000-present
- Publisher: Japanese Society of Snow and Ice (Japan)
- Frequency: Annual
- Open access: Yes

Standard abbreviations
- ISO 4: Bull. Glaciol. Res.

Indexing
- ISSN: 1884-8044

Links
- Journal homepage; Online archive

Bulletin of Glaciological Research is a peer-reviewed scientific journal focusing on all aspects of snow and ice science. It is published by the Japanese Society of Snow and Ice and was established in 2000 as a successor of the Bulletin of Glacier Research (1987–1998). The current editor-in-chief (2025) is Shuji FUJITA (National Institute of Polar Research). The journal is indexed in the Emerging Sources Citation Index (ESCI) and Scopus.

Three types of papers are published:

1. Articles, containing original scientific materials and results, not submitted for publication elsewhere.
2. Reports, containing preliminary findings or reports of activities of general scientific interest.
3. Reviews, containing comprehensive reviews of previous research or summaries of future prospects in a specific field.

All types of papers are peer-reviewed. Papers that pass the peer-review process are published online immediately. Since Volume 28 (2010), the online archive is hosted by the service J-STAGE.
