= RBG Resources =

British firm alleged to have been involved in fraud

RBG Resources was a British public-limited firm based in London that was allegedly involved in a serious fraud worth close to £300 million (US$600 million). RBG Resources made $1.1 billion in sales in 2000. It was an affiliate of the United States based Allied Deals Inc., which was also involved in the fraud, and resulted in 14 people convicted or pleading guilty to related crimes.
