= General Jan Smuts Regiment =

Regiment Westelike Provinsie General Jan Smuts Regiment
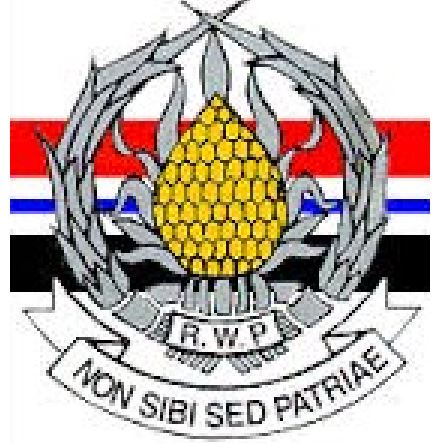
- SANDF Regiment Western Cape emblem
- Active: 1 April 1934–1960; 1974–present
- Country: South Africa
- Allegiance: Republic of South Africa; Republic of South Africa
- Branch: South African Army; South African Army
- Type: Infantry
- Role: Mechanised infantry
- Size: One battalion
- Part of: South African Infantry Formation; Army Conventional Reserve
- Garrison/HQ: Cape Town
- Mottos: Non Sibi Sed Patriae – "Not For Ourselves, But For Our Country"
- March: Ich hatt' einen Kameraden
- Anniversaries: 1 April (Regimental Day)

Commanders
- Current commander: Lt Col. H.H. Gertse
- Honorary Colonel: Capt. G.S. van Niekerk (Col)

Insignia
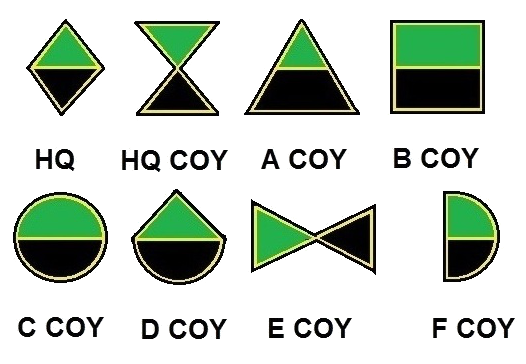
- Company level Insignia

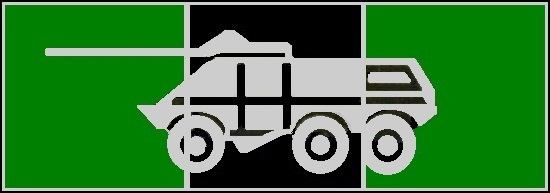
- SA Mechanised Infantry beret bar circa 1992: SA mechanised infantry beret bar circa 1992
- Abbreviation: GJSR

The General Jan Smuts Regiment (formerly Regiment Westelike Provinsie) is a reserve mechanised infantry regiment of the South African Army.

== History ==
=== Origin ===
Regiment Westelike Provinsie (RWP) was one of eight Afrikaner-oriented Traditional Citizen Force infantry units raised by the Union Defence Force on 1 April 1934, as part of a programme to rebuild the UDF after the Great Depression.

=== Predecessors ===
While RWP was only raised in 1934, it regards itself as the successor to several small and short-lived units which were formed in the Western Cape country districts in the nineteenth century and early twentieth century. They were:

==== First Volunteer Movement ====
- Stellenbosch Volunteers – formed 1856, disbanded c. 1865
- Worcester volunteers – formed 1856, disbanded c. 1863
- Paarl Rifle Corps – formed 1856, disbanded 1859
- Malmesbury Volunteer Cavalry – formed 1856, disbanded c. 1866
- Paarl Cavalry – formed 1857, disbanded 1859
- Paarl United Volunteers – formed 1859, disbanded c. 1862
- Robertson and Montague Rifle Corps – formed 1860, disbanded c. 1864

No volunteer units in these districts between 1866 and 1878.

==== Second Volunteer Movement ====
- Worcester Volunteer Rifles – formed 1878, disbanded c. 1879
- Worcester Volunteer Rifles – formed 1885, disbanded 1901
- Paarl Volunteer Rifles – formed 1885, disbanded 1897
- Wellington Volunteer Rifles – formed 1885, disbanded 1901
- Victoria College Volunteer Rifles – formed 1888, disbanded 1899
- Robertson Volunteer Rifles – formed 1890, disbanded
- Malmesbury Volunteer Rifles – formed 1892, disbanded 1896.
- Western Rifles – an administrative grouping, which existed from 1893 to 1908, of the Worcester, Paarl, Wellington, Stellenbosch, Robertson, and Malmesbury units
- Western Light Horse – formed at Worcester 1903, disbanded 1908
- Paarl Volunteers – formed 1906, disbanded 1909.

No volunteer units in these districts between 1909 and 1913.

==== Citizen Force ====
- Western Province Mounted Rifles – formed at Worcester 1913, disbanded 1929
- 1st Western Province Rifles – formed at Worcester 1913, disbanded 1929
- 2nd Western Province Rifles – formed at Malmesbury 1913, disbanded 1929
- 3rd Western Province Rifles – formed at Stellenbosch 1913, disbanded 1929

No CF units in these districts existed between 1929 and 1934.

=== Garrison ===
The regiment was based in the country town of Stellenbosch, 45 kilometres (28 mi) outside Cape Town, and recruited its members from the surrounding districts of the western part of the Cape Province. At that time, Citizen Force service was voluntary.

=== Brandy ===
In 1936 the first specially bottled R.W.P brandy was produced.

=== With the Union Defence Force ===
==== World War Two ====
The National Party-voting Western Cape districts generally did not support South Africa's involvement in World War II. In spite of this R.W.P was able to muster enough men who were willing to go on active service. The Regiment mobilised on 1 September 1940 and became No. 12 Armoured Car Company, South African Tank Corps. After months of training in this new role, No. 12 Armoured Car Company was amalgamated with No. 11 Armoured Car Company (RSWD) Regiment Suid Westelike Distrikte, to form 5th Armoured Fighting Vehicle Regiment, South African Tank Corps. The Regiment moved to Egypt in September 1941 but was disbanded on 13 October 1941 after arrival. The personnel were used as reinforcements for depleted armoured car regiments already operating in the Western Desert with whom they participated in many of the well known battles in North Africa like Sidi Rezegh, Bir Hakeim, Gazala, and El Alamein.

On the disbandment of the South African Tank Corps early in 1943, former RWP personnel were absorbed into the Royal Natal Carbineers and Imperial Light Horse and soon adapted themselves to tank warfare, serving with distinction in their new units with the 6th South African Armoured Division in Italy.

==== Post war ====
The regiment was presented with a Regimental Colour by his Majesty King George VI during the visit of the royal family to South Africa on 31 March 1947. The wartime Prime Minister Gen Jan Smuts accepted the appointment as Colonel-In-Chief of the regiment from 17 September 1948.

==== Remustered and renamed ====
In 1949, RWP itself was converted to Armour, and it was renamed Regiment Onze Jan, after 19th-century Afrikaner political leader Jan Hofmeyr, in 1951. From 1952, Citizen Force recruits were chosen by ballot rather than volunteering.

During the 1950s and 1960s the Regiment was part of the part-time component of Western Province Command.

=== With the SADF ===
When the Army was re-organised for internal security duties in 1960, Regiment Onze Jan was converted back to infantry and was renamed Regiment Boland. Regiment Boland later moved to Paarl and, after the introduction of national service conscription (in 1968), it formed a second battalion in Worcester on 1 September 1970.

The two battalions were separated in April 1974. 1 Regiment Boland resumed the original title Regiment Westelike Provinsie and moved to Cape Town, while 2 Regiment Boland remained in Worcester as Regiment Boland. The only remnant of their association is the similar cap-badges of the two regiments.

==== Operations ====
RWP served in the Angola campaign in 1976, and carried out several tours of duty in the Border War in South West Africa. It was also deployed on internal security duties in the Townships during the 1985–90 State of Emergency.

=== With the SANDF ===
Military service has been voluntary again since 1994. 71 Motorised Brigade and 9 Division were dissolved in the late nineties and the regiment presently forms part of the South African Army Infantry Formation.

==== Name change ====
In August 2019, 52 Reserve Force units had their names changed to reflect the diverse military history of South Africa. Regiment Westelike Provinsie was renamed General Jan Smuts Regiment, and have 3 years to design and implement new regimental insignia.

Jan Smuts, the regiment's honorific, was chosen because Smuts was Colonel-in-Chief of the then Regiment Westelike Provinsie from 1948 until his death. Having served in the Boer War and in both World Wars, the latter of as part of what is now today the SANDF, he was promoted Field Marshal in 1941.

== Regimental Symbols ==
=== Spelling ===
In 1983, RWP adopted the Dutch spelling of "Provincie" because it regards itself as the successor to several short-lived volunteer units which existed in the Stellenbosch and Paarl and neighbouring districts in the 19th century, when Dutch, rather than Afrikaans, was the prevailing language in those areas. (See below for a list of those units.)

=== Insignia ===
- Badge : The Unit's Badge consists of a wreath of leaves of the Silver Leaf tree encompassing a kernel of the same tree with the inscription R.W.P Due to an error in the original artwork, the full stop after the "P" was omitted, hence creating a tradition that remains part of the Regimental history.
- Flash : The beret flash (originally a helmet flash) has horizontal stripes of red over white over black, with a blue diamond on the white stripe: blue and white are the traditional colours of the Western Cape.
- Credo : "Loyalty, Commitment, Excellence"
- March : De Trouwe Kameraad, a Dutch translation of the German Der Guten Kamerad.
- Anniversaries : Regimental Day (1 April) Gen. JC Smuts Parade (24 May)
- Brandy : R.W.P Brandewyn
- Motto : Non Sibi Sed Patriae – Not for ourselves, but for our country.

==== Previous Dress Insignia ====
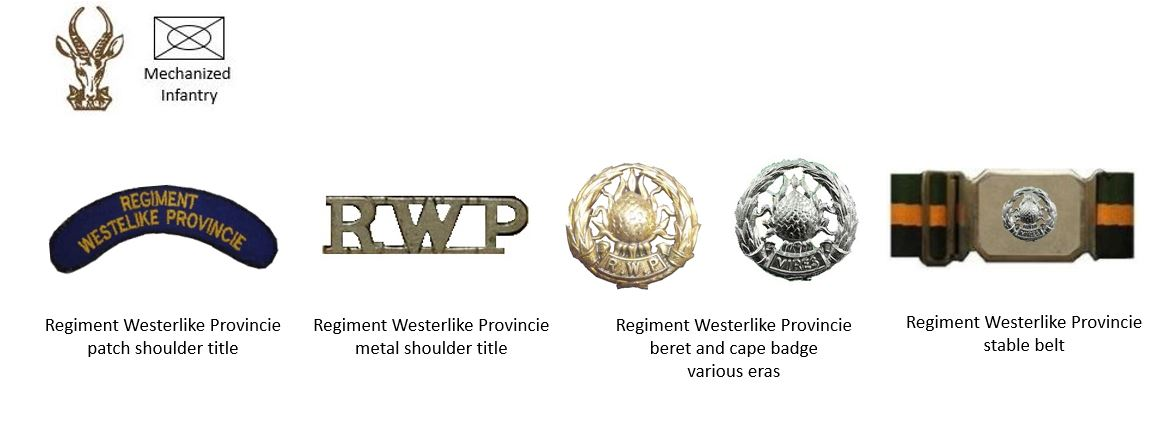
SADF era Regiment Westerlike Provincie insignia

==== Current Dress Insignia ====
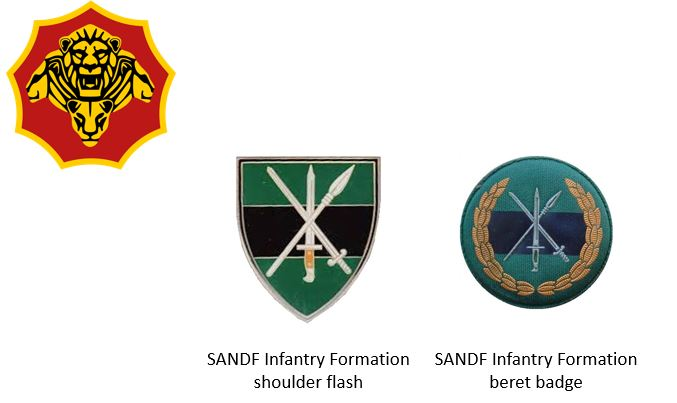
SANDF era Infantry Formation insignia

== Regimental Freedoms ==
R.W.P has been granted the Freedom of the following Cities:

- 23 April 1983: Cape Town
- 3 November 1984: Bellville
- March 1987: Keetmanshoop Honorary Citizenship
- 24 March 1990: Parow
- 24 March 1994: Goodwood
- 2006: Overstrand Municipality Hermanus

These honours mean that the Regiment may march on foot or mechanised with drums beating, colours flying and bayonets fixed through the streets of Cape Town or any of the Overstrand towns, namely Hermanus, Rooi Els, Pringle Bay, Betty's Bay, Kleinmond, Fisherhaven, Hawston, Onrus, Sandbaai, Stanford, Gansbaai, Uilenskraal Mond, Franskraal, Pearly Beach and Baardskeerdersbos.

== Leadership ==
Regiment Westelike Provinsie Leadership
From	Colonel-In-Chief	To	Ribbon
1948	Field Marshal the Right Hon. J.C. Smuts OM,DTD,ED	1950	Order of Merit OM Dekoratie voor Trouwe Dienst DTD Efficiency Decoration (South Africa) ED
From	Honorary Colonels	To	Ribbon
1934-07-10	Maj P. J. Roos (Note: Later Colonel)	1948-09-22	
1960-09-26	Capt W. N. Naude (Col)	1969-02-24	
1982-10-30	Councillor M. J. van Zyl (Col)	1997-11-30	
1997-12-01	Capt G. S. van Niekerk (Col)	Present	
From	Commanding Officers	To	Ribbon
1934-05-31	Lt Col J. H. Wicht CM	1939-09-31	Army Cross CM
1939-09-01	Lt Col G. C. G. Werdmuller	1939-09-06	
1939-09-07	Lt Col C. J. Lemmer	1939-12-08	
1939-12-09	Maj . M. Versveld	1940-01-13	
1940-01-14	Lt Col C. J. Lemmer	1940-08-31	
1940-09-01	Lt Col H. S. G. Taylor	1941-12-31	
1946-02-01	Lt Col L. Verwoerd	1947-06-30	
1947-07-01	Maj . G. W. Krige MC	1947-09-30	Military Cross MC
1947-10-01	Lt Col L. Verwoerd	1948-04-21	
1948-04-22	Maj . G. W. Krige MC	1951-02-11	Military Cross MC
1951-02-12	Cmdt W. S. Malan	1956-01-06	
1956-01-07	Cmdt F. C. de Goede	1961-02-06	
1961-02-07	Cmdt D. I. Moodie SM,JCD	1968-02-29	Southern Cross Medal SM John Chard Decoration JCD
1968-07-22	Cmdt J. Kruger	1971-07-31	
1971-08-01	Cmdt E. J. J. Nel	1972-06-06	
1972-06-07	Cmdt A. A. Rossouw JCD	1976-03-25	John Chard Decoration JCD
1976-03-26	Cmdt A. W. Bester SD,SM,MMM,JCD		Southern Cross Decoration SD Southern Cross Medal SM Military Merit Medal MMM John Chard Decoration JCD
1982-01-01	Cmdt G. W. Boshoff SD,SM,MMM,JCD	1987-03-31	Southern Cross Decoration SD Southern Cross Medal SM Military Merit Medal MMM John Chard Decoration JCD
1987-04-01	Cmdt D. J. Holtzhausen SM,MMM,JCD	1992-04-02	Southern Cross Medal SM Military Merit Medal MMM John Chard Decoration JCD
1992-04-03	Lt Col A. A. Duminy MMM,JCD	1999-04-01	Military Merit Medal MMM John Chard Decoration JCD
1999-04-02	Lt Col D. H. Saayman MMM,JCD	2000-04-01	Military Merit Medal MMM John Chard Decoration JCD
2000-04-02	Lt Col J. J. Visser MMM,JCD	2005-04-01	Military Merit Medal MMM John Chard Decoration JCD
2005-04-02	Lt Col S. E. Pierce	2012-08-18	
2012-08-19	Lt Col H. H. Gertse	Present	
From	Regimental Sergeants Major	To	Ribbon
1934	WO1 SH Joubert	1938	
1939	WO1 SW Burger	1945	
1946	WO1 F Ferreira	1952	
1952	WO1 R du Toit	1955	
1955	WO1 M Louw	1956	
1957	WO1 IM van Rooyen	1964	
1965	WO1 L Liebenberg	1968	
1969	WO1 H du Toit	1972	
1972	WO1 PF de Bruyn	1983	
1983	WO1 MP Eagar	1985	
1985	WO1 WP van Rhyn	1992	
1992	WO1 DR Oosthuizen	1992	
1992	WO1 ND van der Walt	2001	
2001	WO1 JM Cupido	2005	
2005	WO1 T Jordaan	2005	
2006	WO1 A Wakies	Present	
