= Queen Nandi Mounted Rifles =

Natal Mounted Rifles Queen Nandi Mounted Rifles
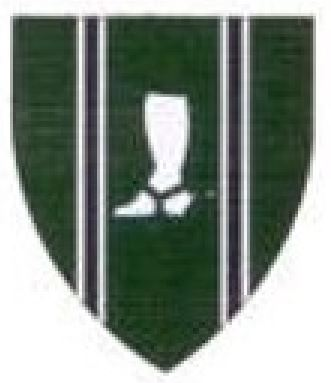
- SANDF Natal Mounted Rifles emblem
- Active: 1854–Present
- Country: South Africa
- Allegiance: Colony of Natal; Republic of South Africa; Republic of South Africa
- Branch: South African Army; South African Army
- Type: Armour
- Role: Armour / Tank and Mechanised Infantry Regiment
- Size: Regiment
- Part of: South African Armoured Formation; Army Conventional Reserve
- Garrison/HQ: Durban
- Motto: Rough but Ready
- Anniversaries: Regimental Birthday - 23 March each year.
- Equipment: Marmon Herrington Mk1V / Ferret armoured cars / Olifant mk1 A and B tanks
- Website: www.nmr-1854.co.za

Insignia
- Boot and Spur: Prancing Horse
- Beret Colour: Black
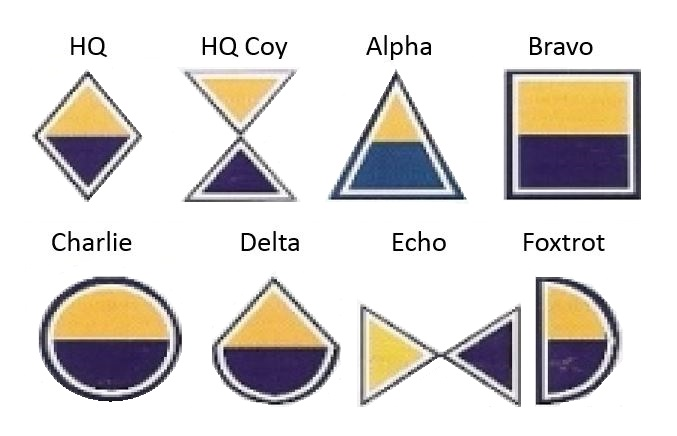
- Armour Squadron emblems

- Armour beret bar circa 1992
- Abbreviation: QNMR

The Queen Nandi Mounted Rifles (formerly the Natal Mounted Rifles) is a reserve armoured regiment of the South African Army.

== History ==
=== Origin ===
The original and accepted parent unit of the Natal Mounted Rifles is the Royal Durban Rangers which was formed at a meeting of the public in the town of Durban, at Boltbee's Hotel on 23 March 1854. Other ante-cedant units that were then subsequently amalgamated into the NMR since 1854 are as follows:

1. 1854–1869: Royal D'Urban Rangers
2. 1888–1869: Victoria Mounted Rifles
3. 1875–1887: Stanger Mounted Rifles
4. 1865–1888: Alexander Mounted Rifles
5. 1878–1879: Isipingo Mounted Rifles
6. 1873–1888: Durban Mounted Rifles
7. 1884–1888: Umzimkulu Mounted Rifles

=== Formation ===
In May 1868 the Regimental Committee of the Durban Mounted Rifles, presided over by Captain WH Addison, held a meeting to discuss the forming of the Natal Mounted Rifles. The formation of the regiment would entail the amalgamation of four Volunteer Units; Royal D'urban Rangers (1854), Victoria Mounted Rifles (1862), Alexander Mounted Rifles (1865) and Durban Mounted Rifles (1873).

=== Anglo-Boer War ===
The regiment was re-activated in Durban during February and March 1901 for service in the South African War. It was originally called the 2nd Natal Volunteer Composite Regiment but the name was soon changed to Natal Mounted Infantry. The unit was armed and equipped by the Natal Volunteer Department and horsed by the Imperial Remount Department. The first depot was at Dundee, but, on the unit changing its name, this was transferred to Newcastle.

=== World War I ===
At the outbreak of World War I, the regiment became the 3rd Mounted Rifles and was attached to the 8th Mounted Brigade with the Central Force in the German South West African Campaign. On 1 July 1913 the Regiment was re-amalgamated with the Border Mounted Rifles, renamed the 3rd Mounted Rifles (Natal Mounted Rifles) and transferred to the Active Citizen Force of the Union Defence Force.

=== World War II ===
In 1932 the Regiment's name was simplified to The Natal Mounted Rifles and in 1934 it was converted to infantry. The regiment was mounted for 80 years until July 1934 when horses were entirely dispensed with and NMR converted to a machine-gun unit. In January 1934 the regiment was re-mustered as an armoured reconnaissance regiment of the 6th South African Armoured Division.

In addition to the campaigns in which its various constituent units fought in before the Regiment's formation, the Natal Mounted Rifles served in the Second Anglo-Boer War (1899–1902), the Zulu Rebellion (1906–1907), World War I (specifically in South-West Africa from 1914 to 1915), World War II (See 1st SA Infantry Division and South Africa's post-war internal conflicts and the South African Border War).

=== Post 1994 ===
Since the 1994 Democratic Elections, the NMR has undergone several training exercises and continues to recruit members into its ranks. It boasts a Regimental Pipe Band and is affiliated to The King's Own Hussars.

=== Name change ===
In August 2019, 52 Reserve Force units had their names changed to reflect the diverse military history of South Africa. The Natal Mounted Rifles became the Queen Nandi Mounted Rifles, and have 3 years to design and implement new regimental insignia.

== Regimental ==
=== Symbols ===
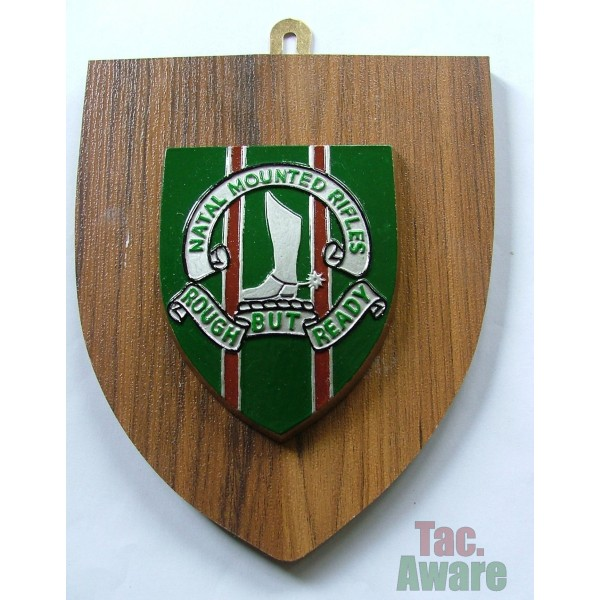
NMR Badge Plaque

Regimental mottos:

- 1888–1913: Just and frank
- 1913 – Present: Rough but ready

=== Previous dress insignia ===
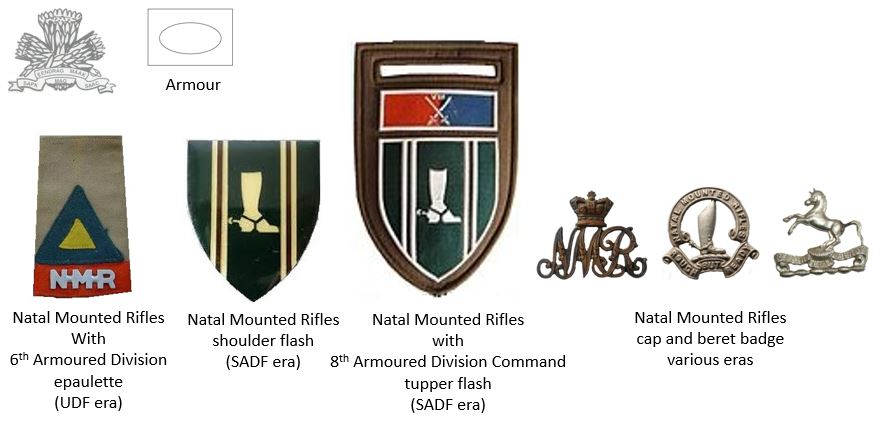
UDF and SADF eras Natal Mounted Rifles insignia

=== Alliances ===
- United Kingdom – affiliated 9 April 1930 to The Queen's Royal Hussars (The Queen's Own and Royal Irish)
- Glenwood Boys High School affiliated to NMR on 17 February 1936
- South African School of Armour affiliated to NMR on 21 March 1997
- Durban Metro Police Equestrian Unit affiliated to NMR on 25 March 2000
- South African Air Force No.15 (Helicopter) Squadron, Durban, affiliated to NMR

== Battle honours ==
Battle Honours
Awarded
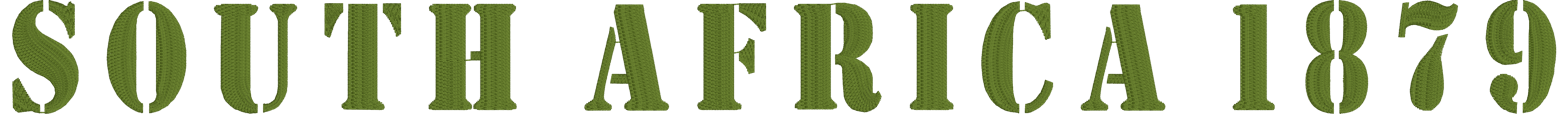
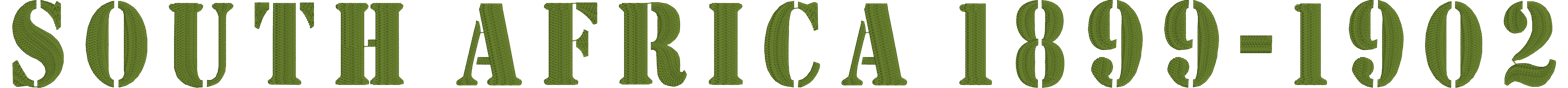
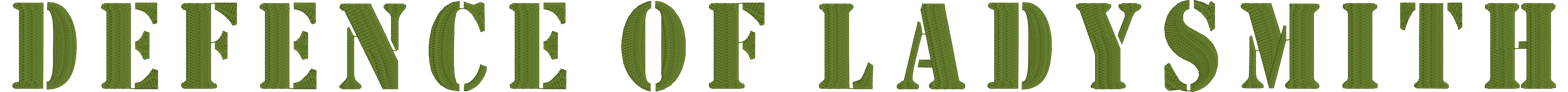
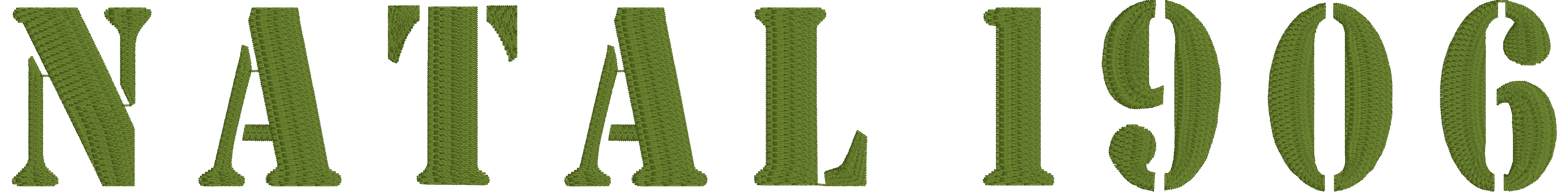
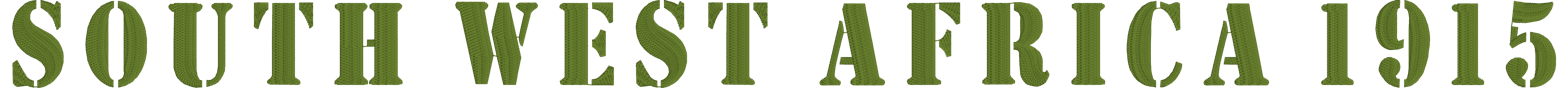
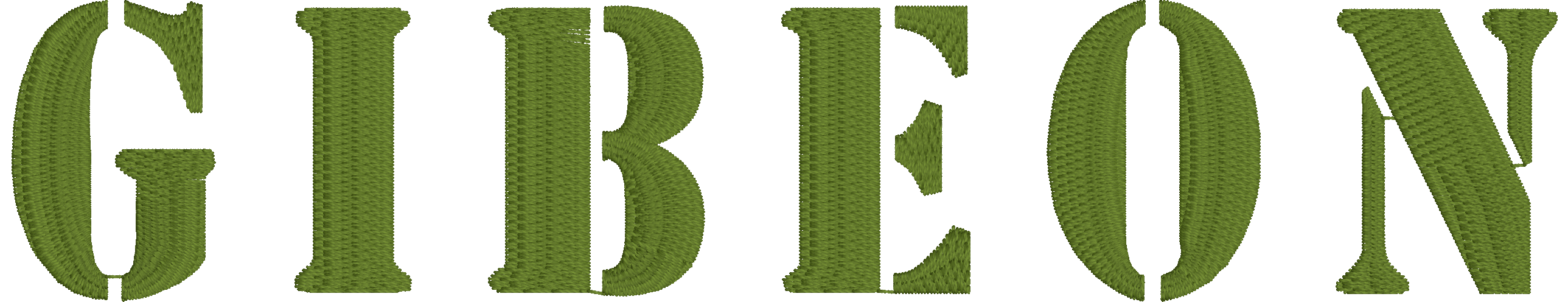
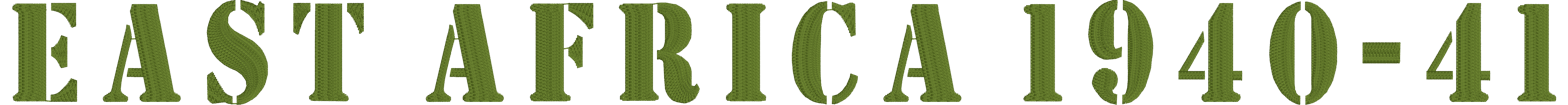
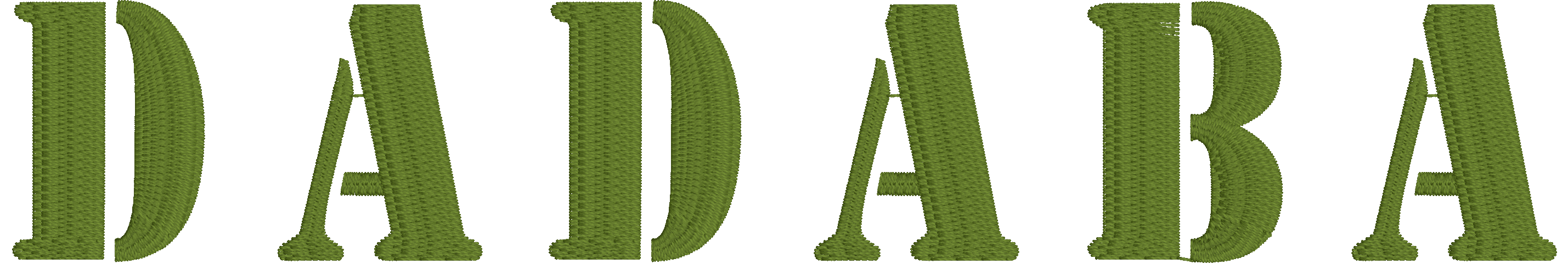
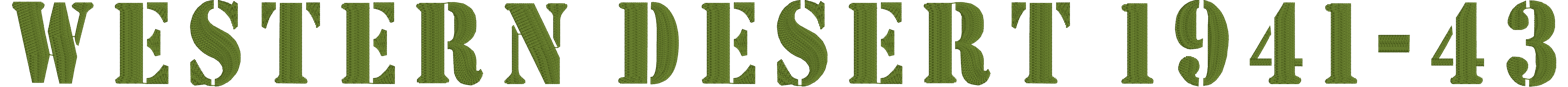
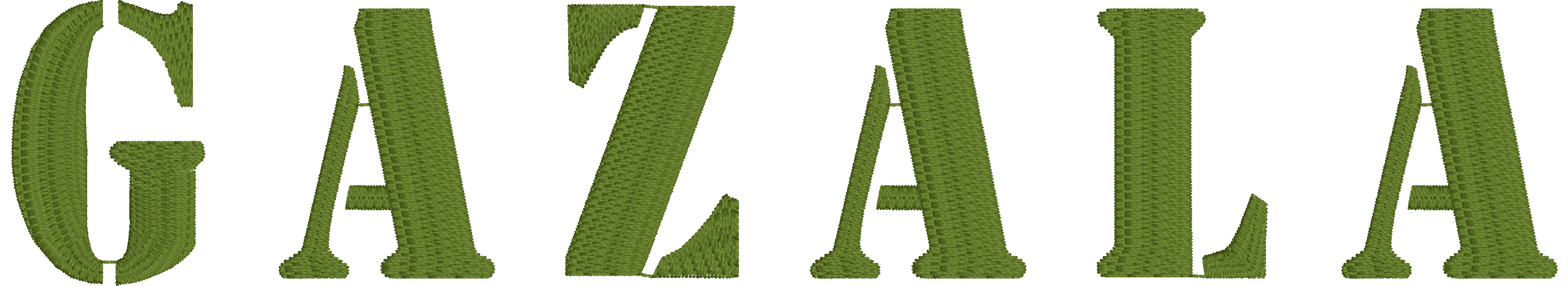
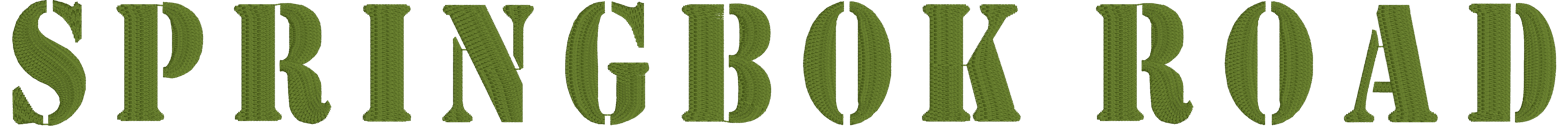
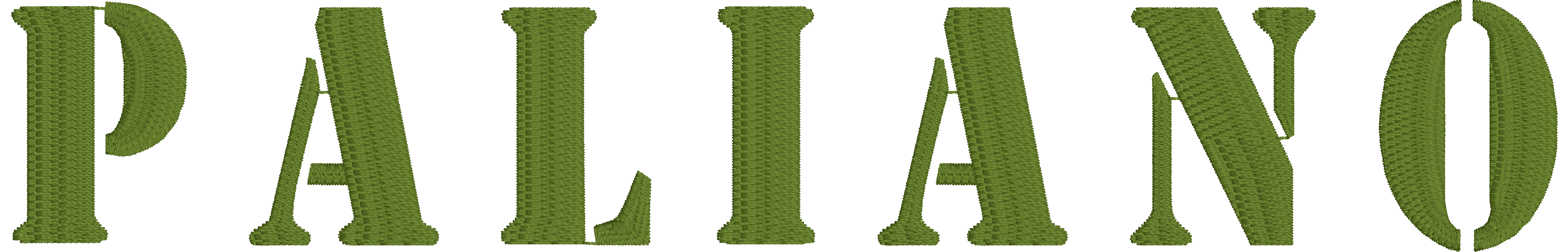
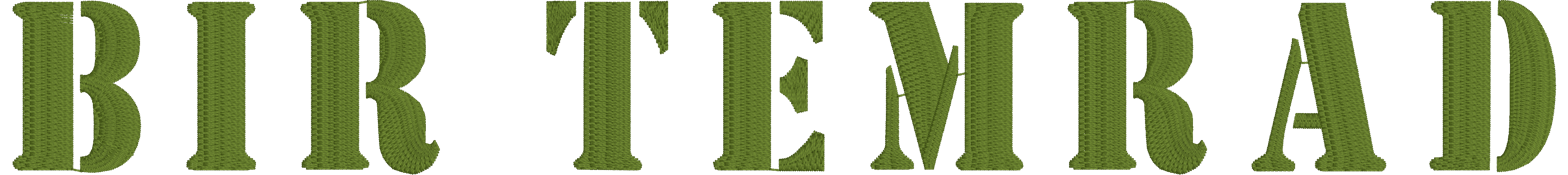
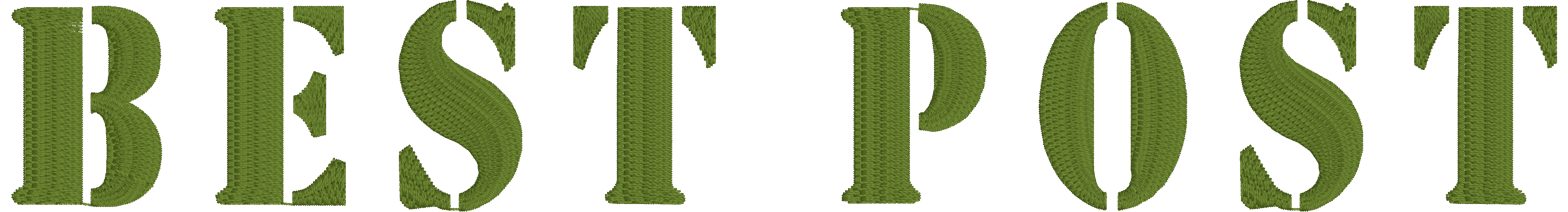
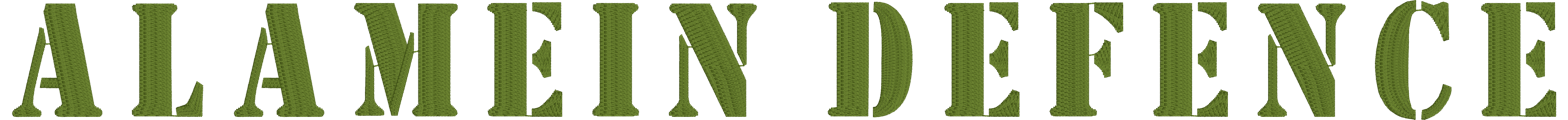
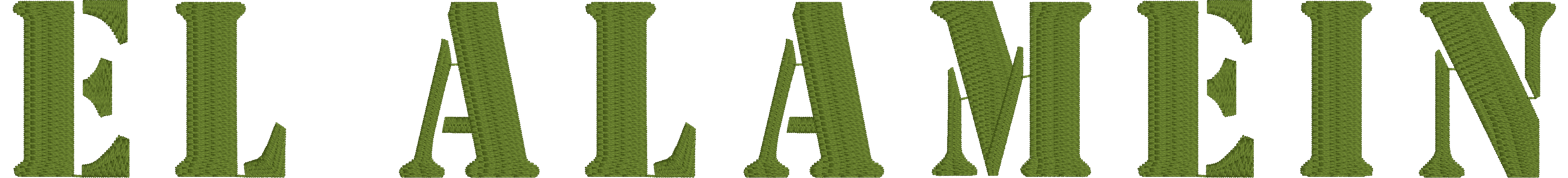
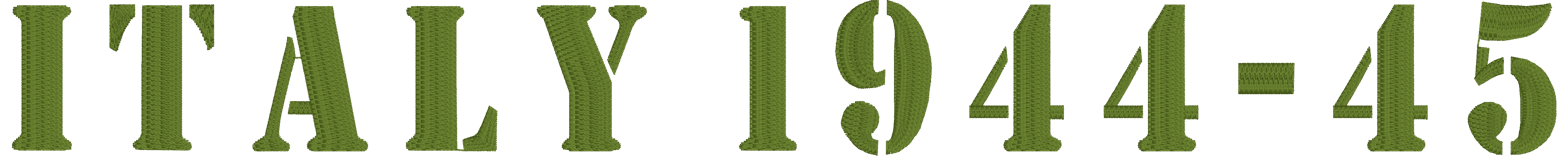
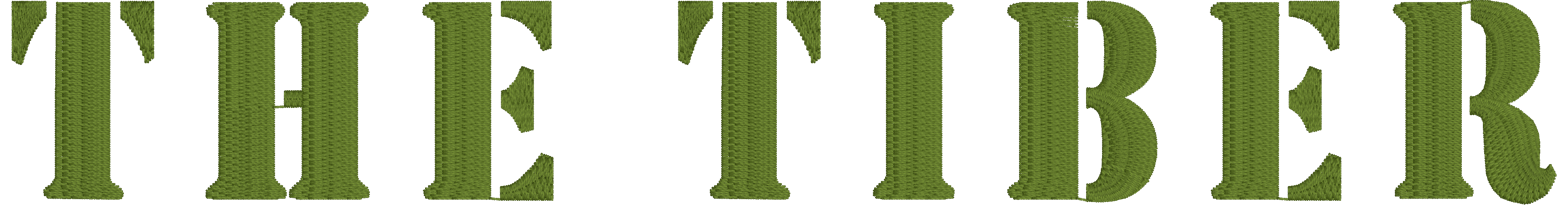
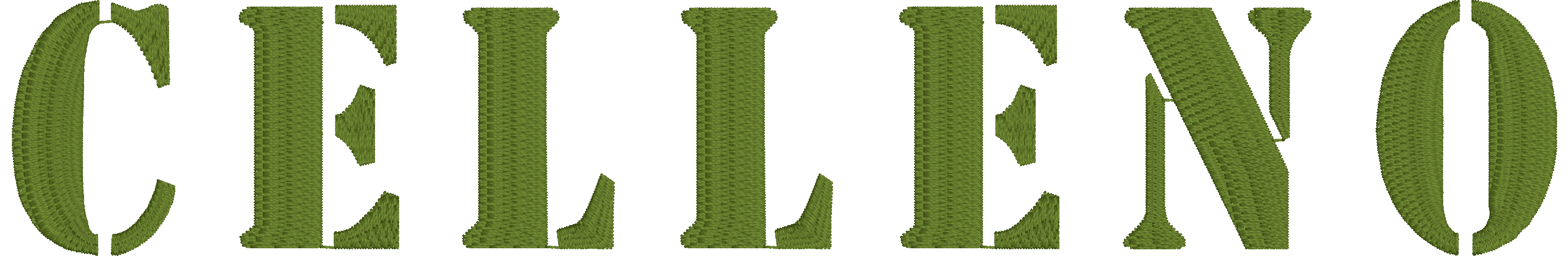
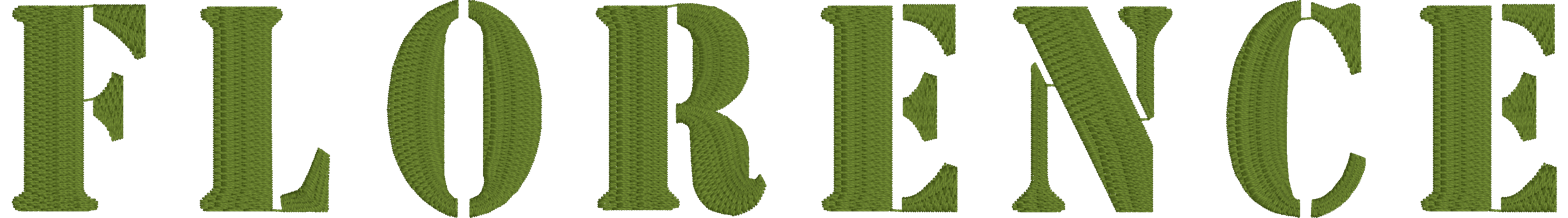
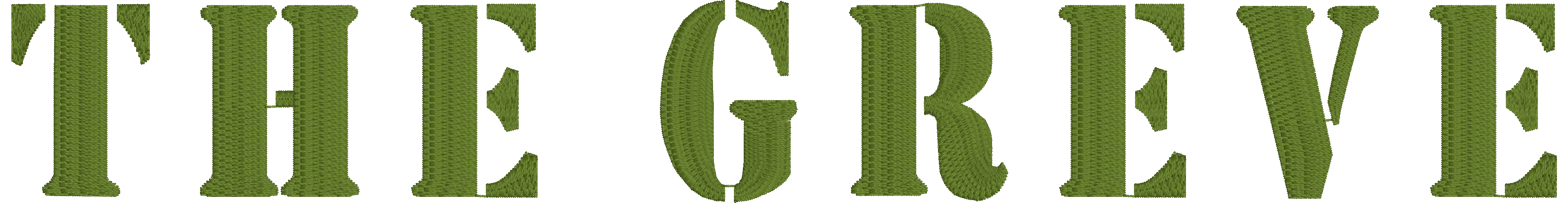
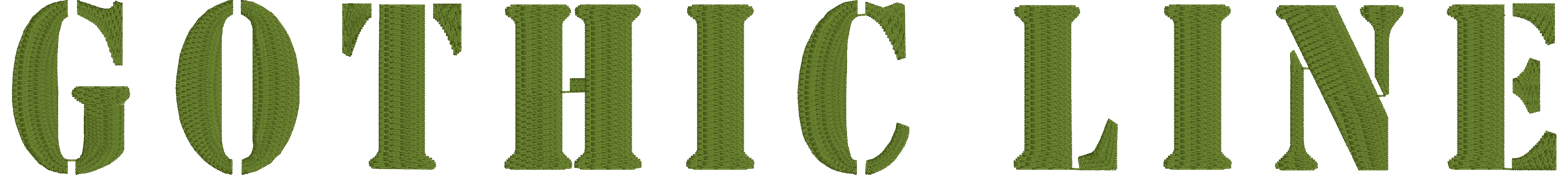
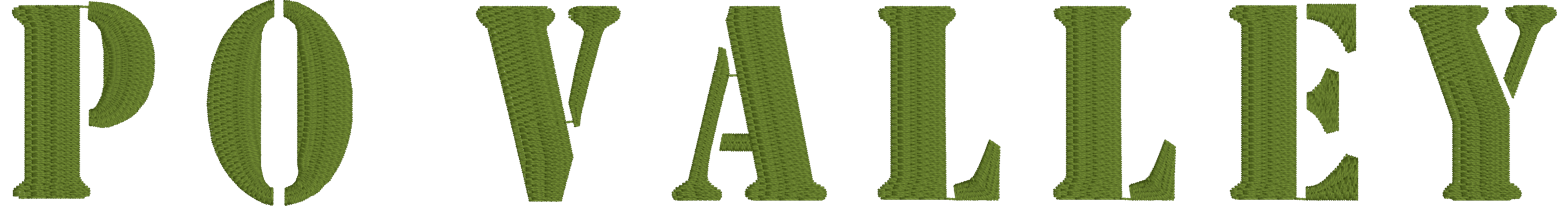
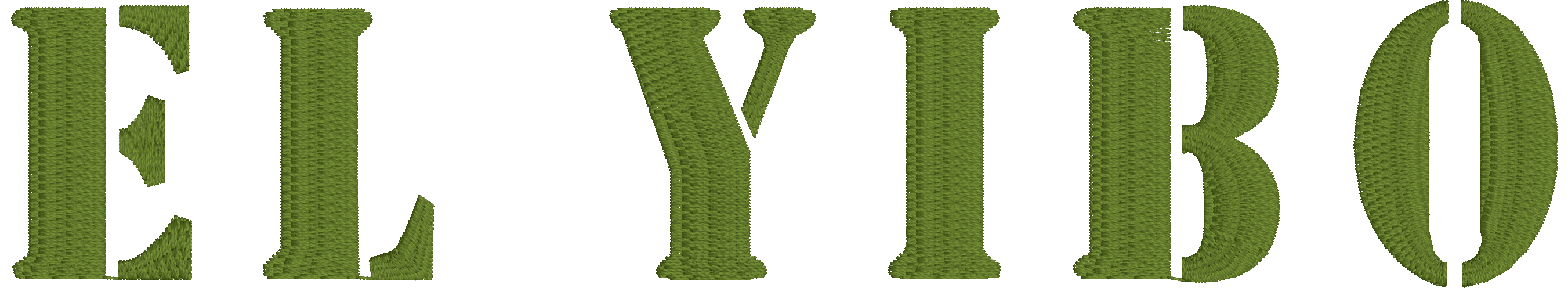
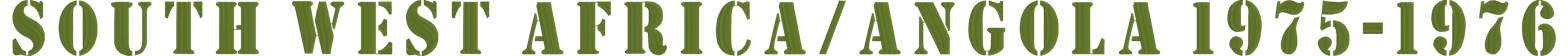

- South Africa 1879
- South Africa 1899–1902
  - Defence of Ladysmith
- Natal 1906
- South-West Africa 1914–1915
  - Gibeon
- East Africa 1940–1941
  - Dadaba
- Western Desert 1941–1943 (Note: See 1st SA Infantry Division)
- Gazala
- Springbok Road
- Paliano
- Bir Temrad
  - Best Post
  - Alamein Defence
  - El Alamein
- Italy 1944–1945
  - The Tiber
  - Celleno
  - Florence
  - The Greve
  - Gothic Line
  - Po Valley
- El Yibo (The first action of the NMR in World War II 16–18 January 1940)
- South African Border War 1975–1976

== Leadership ==
Natal Mounted Rifles Leadership
From	Honorary Colonels	To	Ribbon
1900	Col Godfrey T Hurst DSO,OBE,VD	1901	Distinguished Service Order DSO Order of the British Empire OBE Colonial Auxiliary Forces Officers' Decoration VD
nd	Vacant	n.d.	
From	Commanding Officers	To	Ribbon
2001	Lt Col Donald P Hobson	2002	
2002	Lt Col Denys Currie	9 April 2005	
9 April 2005	Lt Col Mike Rowe	23 March 2018	
23 March 2018	Lt Col S. Cele	n.d.	
From	Second in Command	To	Ribbon
2004	Maj F. A. M. van Schaik	n.d.	
From	Regimental Sergeants Major	To	Ribbon
nd	MWO Bobby Freeman	n.d.	
