= General Botha Regiment =

Regiment Botha General Botha Regiment
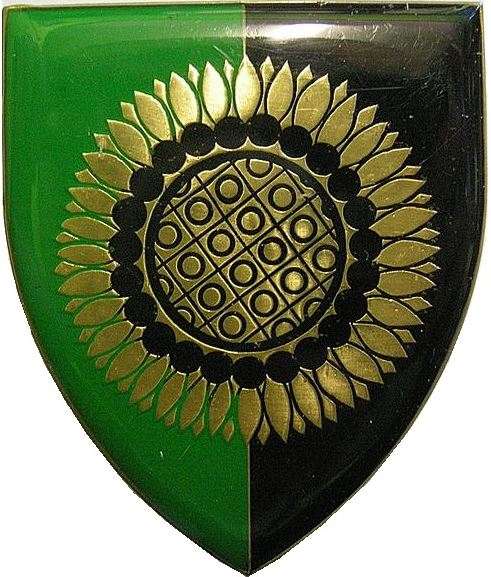
- SANDF Regiment Botha emblem
- Active: 1 April 1934 to present
- Country: South Africa
- Allegiance: Republic of South Africa; Republic of South Africa
- Branch: South African Army; South African Army
- Type: Infantry
- Role: Motorised Infantry
- Size: One Battalion
- Part of: South African Infantry Formation; Army Conventional Reserve
- Garrison/HQ: Barberton, Mpumalanga
- Mottos: Altyd gereed (Always ready)
- Anniversaries: 1 April 1934

Insignia
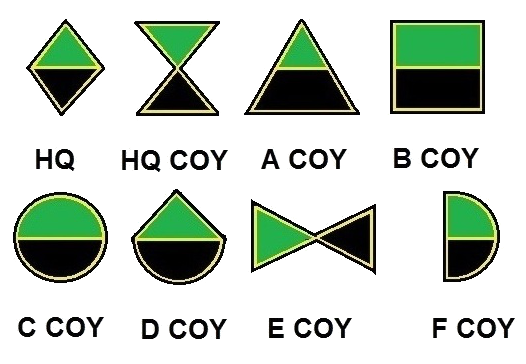
- Company level Insignia

- SA Motorised Infantry beret bar circa 1992: SA Motorised Infantry beret bar
- Abbreviation: GBR

The General Botha Regiment (formerly Regiment Botha) is a reserve infantry regiment of the South African Army. The Regiment was named after General Louis Botha, the first prime minister of South Africa.

== History ==
The regiment was formed in Ermelo, Mpumalanga on 1 April 1934, as part of an expansion of the Army's infantry branch.

=== World War 2 ===
A second battalion was formed on the outbreak of World War II in 1939. The first battalion did not serve in the war, but the second fought in the North Africa campaign in 1941 and 1942 as part of the 1st Infantry Division. In 1943, it was temporarily amalgamated with Regiment President Steyn.

=== Sister Battalion ===
The two battalions separated after the war, and in 1951 the second battalion was renamed Regiment Christiaan Beyers. From 1960 to 1966, Regiment Botha was called Regiment Pongola.

== SANDF's Motorised Infantry ==
SANDF's Motorised Infantry is transported mostly by Samil trucks, Mamba APC's or other un-protected motor vehicles. Samil 20, 50 and 100 trucks transport soldiers, towing guns, and carrying equipment and supplies. Samil trucks are all-wheel drive, in order to have vehicles that function reliably in extremes of weather and terrain. Motorised infantry have an advantage in mobility allowing them to move to critical sectors of the battlefield faster, allowing better response to enemy movements, as well as the ability to outmaneuver the enemy.

=== Name changed ===
In August 2019, 52 Reserve Force units had their names changed to reflect the diverse military history of South Africa. Regiment Botha had its title amended to General Botha Regiment, and was given 3 years to design and implement new regimental insignia.

== Leadership ==
Leadership
From	Lt col S A Mbuyazi	To	Ribbon
	No known incumbents		
From	Officer Commanding 2LT DK Nyaseko	To	Ribbon
	No known incumbents		
From	Regimental Sergeants Major T Smiths	To	Ribbon
	No known incumbents		

== Insignia ==
=== Previous Dress Insignia ===
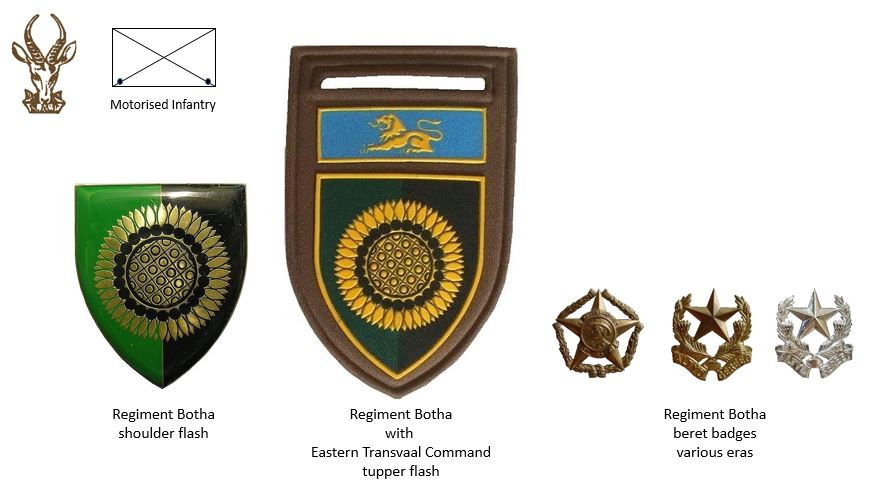
SADF era Regiment Botha insignia

=== Current Dress Insignia ===
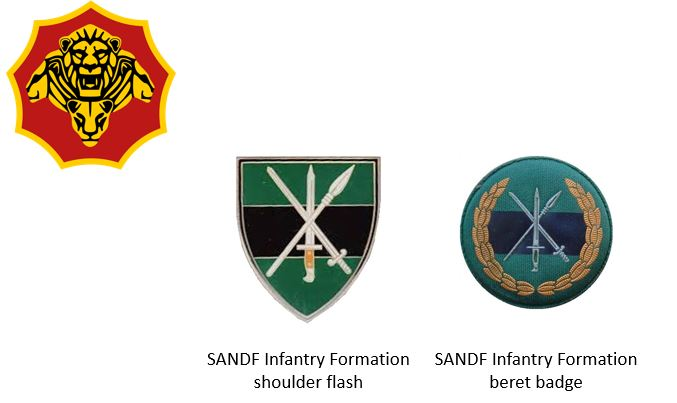
SANDF era Infantry Formation insignia
