= Andrew Mlangeni Regiment =

South African Army reserve unit

South African Irish Regiment 22 Field Regiment (South African Irish), South African Artillery South African Irish Regiment Andrew Mlangeni Regiment
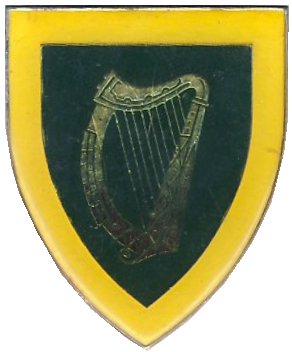
- Regiment emblem
- Active: 1 December 1914–1919; 1939–present
- Country: South Africa
- Allegiance: Union of South Africa; Republic of South Africa; Republic of South Africa
- Branch: South African Army; South African Army; South African Army
- Type: Infantry
- Role: Motorised infantry
- Size: One battalion
- Part of: South African Infantry Formation; Army Conventional Reserve
- Garrison/HQ: Kensington Garrison - Johannesburg
- Anniversaries: 1 December (Regimental day); 23 November (Sidi Rezegh Day)

Commanders
- Current commander: Coporal. Mpondo
- Colonel of the Regiment: Colonel B. Molefe

Insignia
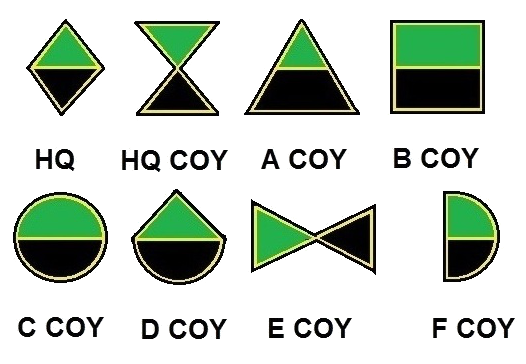
- Company level Insignia

- SA Motorised Infantry beret bar circa 1992: SA Motorised Infantry beret bar
- Abbreviation: AMR

The Andrew Mlangeni Regiment (formerly the South African Irish Regiment) is a reserve infantry regiment of the South African Army.

== History ==
=== Origins ===
Although all the regular units of Irish origin in the British Army have served in South Africa at some time during its colonial involvement in South Africa, the first autonomous South African units shaped by Irish influences were the Cape Town Irish Volunteer Rifles (raised by a Major O'Reilly in 1885) and Driscoll's Scouts (raised by Capt D.P. Driscoll during the Second Anglo-Boer War of 1899 – 1902).

However, an Irish Brigade also fought on the side of the Boer republics.

=== World War I ===
The South African Irish was formed at the outbreak of World War I in August 1914 when three officers (Major George Twomey, Captain J. Jeoffreys and a Captain MacDonald) met at the Irish Club in Johannesburg to raise an Irish regiment from among the citizens of Johannesburg and its surrounding areas.

After a request to The Union Defence Force (UDF) Headquarters, authority was granted to form the regiment and Lieutenant-Colonel Brennan was appointed as its first commanding officer. Major Twomey was appointed as its recruiting officer. The wife of General Louis Botha (a lady of Irish descent with the maiden name of Emmett) was appointed as the regiment's first honorary colonel.

Sources are not clear on the official date of formation of the South African Irish, but it is either 9 September or 1 December 1914. In any case, the battalion, consisting of six companies, first formed up at Booysens Camp in Johannesburg on the former date.

After training, the regiment was made part of 4 South African Infantry Brigade (part of the Northern Force) and embarked from Cape Town to the (then) German South-West Africa on 21 December 1914. On 25 December 1914, the Force landed at Walvis Bay and went into action immediately. The Regiment itself first came into contact with their German enemy on the following day, barely three months after it was raised.

At the end of the campaign in South-West Africa, Active Citizen Force regiments were by law not permitted to proceed to other theatres of war as such. Special war service units were thus created to fight in East Africa and Europe. Volunteers from the South African Irish Regiment were formed, together with members of other units, into the composite 9 South African Infantry Regiment. 9 SAI campaigned in East Africa, where it earned the honours Kilimanjaro and East Africa 1916–17.

The SA Irish were formally disbanded on 31 December 1919.

On 29 January 1921, at a ceremony in Johannesburg, the regiment was posthumously presented with the King's Colour by Prince Arthur of Connaught, the (then) Governor-General of the Union of South Africa, in recognition of its service in South-West Africa.

=== World War II ===
==== Mobilisation ====
At the outbreak of World War II in 1939 the 1st South African Irish Regiment was reformed through the efforts of Major Twomey, Captains Jeoffreys and Cullinan (the latter was the son of Sir Thomas Cullinan, of diamond fame).

Although the unit was designated as the 1st South African Irish a second battalion was never formed as the men intended for this second battalion were drafted to the first. In practice, the usual designation for the regiment was thus the South African Irish Regiment.

The South African Irish Regiment initially consisted of a regimental HQ, a Support Company and three infantry companies; a pipe band was later added.

After a period of training, the regiment was mobilised on 16 June 1940 under the command of Lieutenant-Colonel D.I. Somerset. It was grouped together with 2 Regiment Botha and 3 Transvaal Scottish to form the 5th South African Infantry Brigade. In July of the same year, the brigade was shipped to Kenya via the port of Durban to become part of 1st South African Infantry Division.

==== East Africa ====
After concentrating at the town of Gilgil in Kenya, the regiment took part in the invasion of Southern Abyssinia on 1 February 1941, part of the East African campaign; it distinguished itself during the fighting at El Gumu, Hobok and Banno in early February as well as during the capture of Mega on 18 February.

5 Brigade, including the South African Irish, then returned to Kenya and embarked at Mombasa on 18 April. The Brigade reached Suez in Egypt on 1 May.

==== Western Desert ====
In November 1941 Operation Crusader, the invasion of Libya and relief of Tobruk, began. 5 South African Infantry Brigade, together with the Transvaal Horse Artillery Regiment, took part in the fighting at Sidi Rezegh culminating on 23 November 1941 with the German armour overwhelming the Allied forces, destroying 5 Brigade, and breaking through to the Eighth Army's rear areas on the Libyan border with Egypt. The casualties of the South African Irish were extremely heavy (only 140 men of all ranks survived), including its commanding officer, Lieutenant-Colonel Dobbs who was wounded in the early stages of the battle (he was replaced by Major C. McN. Cochran). Major Cochran then led the remnants of the battalion, along with the remaining five guns of 9th Field Battery eastwards towards the lines of the Scottish (these were the only guns in 5 Brigade which were not captured!), in an attempt to escape.

In addition, several members of the unit drowned while on their way to Italy by ship as prisoners of war. The survivors of the regiment served with New Zealand forces until the end of November when they rejoined the remnants of the decimated Brigade at Mersa Matruh.

Due to their heavy losses, the South African Irish and 3 Transvaal Scottish ceased to exist as independent infantry units. In February 1942, the survivors of these two battalions joined to form a composite battalion and it was later reconstituted as 2nd Regiment Botha under command of Lt-Col Boerstra. 2nd Regiment Botha was then further reinforced with replacements coming from the 2nd Witwatersrand Rifles after which, the battalion moved by rail and in New Zealand troop carriers from Mersa Matruh to El Adem. In this form, the remnants of the South African Irish were once again in action during September 1942, during the fighting at El Alamein.

11 Battery, 4 Field Regiment, South African Artillery, returned to the Union of South Africa in 1943 and was reconstituted as 4/22 Field Regiment, South African Artillery. This unit later returned to North Africa as a component of the South African 6th Armoured Division and also took part in the subsequent fighting in Italy.

The regiment received four battle honours (see below) for its service during World War II, but they were not awarded immediately because, at the time of the publication of the honours, the unit was an artillery regiment – artillery regiments in the South African Army do not carry any honours. However, when the regiment was later converted back to an infantry unit it became entitled to those honours and they were incorporated into the colour of the regiment.

=== Post-War ===
At the end of World War II, it was requested that the regiment be reformed as an infantry unit. However, as there was no intention at that time to establish additional Active Citizen Force infantry battalions, this request was refused. However, as a form of compensation, authority was granted for the formation of an artillery unit with the designation of 22 Field Regiment (South African Irish), South African Artillery. This unit was formed in June 1946 and it operated until 31 December 1959 as an artillery regiment. However, on 1 January 1960, the regiment was converted back to an infantry unit and regained its old nomenclature, the South African Irish Regiment.

The period from 1960 to 1974 saw the regiment entrenching its traditions as an infantry regiment and during this period received the Freedom of the City of Johannesburg (Nov 1966), and their Regimental Colours (Nov 68). During this period the regiment formed and trained the Hunter Group, a volunteer special force unit, which was the precursor to the Reconnaissance Regiments.

In 1971 members of the regiment and Regimental Association started the annual visit or "raid" to Barberton. In 1966 and 1971 the regiment participated in the 5th and 10th respective anniversaries of the Republic.

==== Citizen Force Divisions and the Border War ====
The period from 1974 to 1988 saw the regiment being part of 7th South African Infantry Division's 72nd Motorised Brigade and being re-established as a conventional force. During these years the regiment saw active duty in Angola during Operation Savannah and Operation Protea as well as undertaking operational duties during the Border war, together with internal security duties within South Africa; and exercises at the Army Battle School, e.g. Quicksilver and Thunderchariot. In 1987, the regiment underwent conversion from a motorised infantry regiment to a mechanised infantry regiment.

In 1979 the regiment was granted the Freedom of entry to the City of Barberton because of the WWII training period and the frequent "raids" to the town. In 1984 the regiment, as part of 72 Motorised Brigade, participated in the parade celebrating the 10th Anniversary of the brigade's Formation.

In 1989, due to the reorganisation of the forces within the conventional force brigades, the regiment was transferred to the 8th South African Armoured Division's 81st Armoured Brigade. This year was also the 75th anniversary of the formation of the regiment and this event was celebrated by a battalion parade in Barberton.

In 1991 the regiment organised the National 50th anniversary of the Battle of Sidi Rezegh Parade in Johannesburg. In the same year, due to further restructuring of the conventional forces the regiment was transferred to Northern Cape Command and reverted to a motorised infantry regiment. During this period the regiment successfully completed township unrest camps as well as training exercises at the Army Battle School.

==== Post 1994 ====
From 1992 to 1998 the regiment went through a period of significant decline as the annual intake of national servicemen dried up with the ending of conscription. In 1998, the regimental muster was only four strong.

In 1999, the regiment began to recruit untrained members directly from the streets, training them on a part-time basis. At the completion of internal training, the recruits were then sent to a regular army training establishment for final assessment and evaluation. The success of this approach lead not only to the expansion of the concept, but also the transformation of the regiment, with not only the first black riflemen entering the ranks but black Officers and NCOs joining the unit.

By 2004, the regiment had grown back to two companies in strength and a Regimental HQ, the same size it had traditionally been during the 1950s and 1960s.

===== Deployments =====
By 2005, members of the regiment were being deployed in the Democratic Republic of Congo (DRC) in support of UN peace support operations. At the same time the regiment reached an active strength of 532 members.

2006 saw members of the regiment again deployed externally to the DRC, whilst domestically the regiment was tasked with executing conversion training for ex Commando members converting to the conventional reserve following the closure of the ATR.

In 2007 SAIR was again tasked with ATR/ACR conversion, while 2008 saw SAIR providing 50 members to the Witwatersrand Rifles company deploying to the Sudan. At the same time, the regiment received orders to prepare for further deployment to the DRC in 2009.

==== Name change ====
In August 2019, 52 Reserve Force units had their names changed to reflect the diverse military history of South Africa. The South African Irish Regiment became the Andrew Mlangeni Regiment, and have 3 years to design and implement new regimental insignia.

=== Precedence ===
The regiment at present stands 16th in order of precedence amongst the infantry battalions of the Reserve Force. This precedence, however, may be elevated if a claim to an earlier date of establishment is officially recognized. The original motto of the regiment in 1914 was that of the Royal Irish Rifles (later the Royal Ulster Rifles), 'Quis separabit?') ('Who will separate us?'). During World War 2 it changed to 'Faugh-a-ballagh' ('Clear the way'), which has remained to the present time. The motto echoes the history of the Royal Irish Fusiliers the First Battalion of which was known as the 'Faugh-a-Ballaghs', an honorary title conferred upon them during the Peninsular War (1809–1812).

== Freedom of Entry ==
The unit exercised its freedom of entry into Johannesburg on 9 November 2013 as part of the centenary celebrations of the City of Johannesburg with bayonets fixed, colours flying and drums beating.

== Regimental Symbols ==
- A green hackle is worn by this regiment.
- The regiment wear black boots (as opposed to brown) in recognition of the near-destruction of the regiment in World War II.
- The original (1914) motto of the regiment was "Quis separabit?" ("Who will separate us?"), but during World War II it changed to "Faugh-a-ballagh" ("Clear the way"), which it has remained to the present day.
- The regimental cap badge consists of the Irish harp and the regimental motto.
- The regimental march was "The County Down Militia" but was later changed to "Killaloe".
- When the regiment was re-formed in 1939 a Pipe Band was raised, which remained with the it until 1949, after which it became the South African Irish Regimental Association Pipe Band.
- This regiment was affiliated with the London Irish Rifles in 1949.
- The Freedom of the City has been conferred upon the Regiment by both the Johannesburg and Barberton Municipalities.

=== Dress Insignia ===
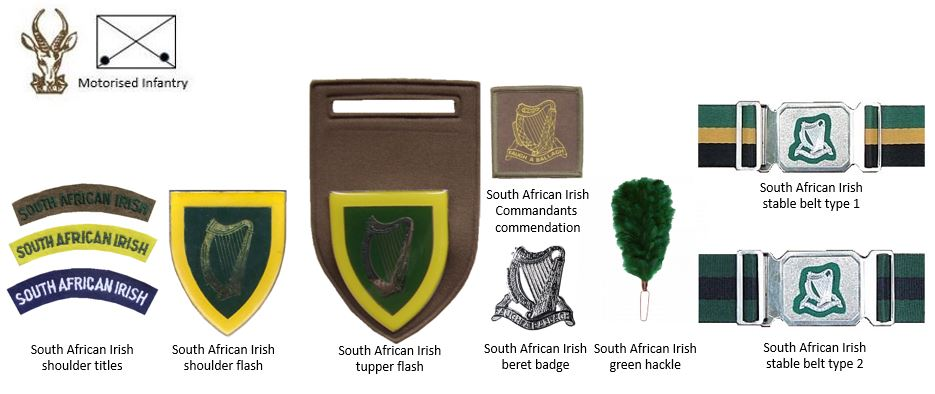
SADF era South African Irish Regiment insignia

=== Alliances ===
- United Kingdom – The Royal Irish Regiment (27th (Inniskilling) 83rd, 87th and Ulster Defence Regiment)

== Battle honours ==
The following Battle Honours have been awarded to the regiment:

Battle Honours
Awarded
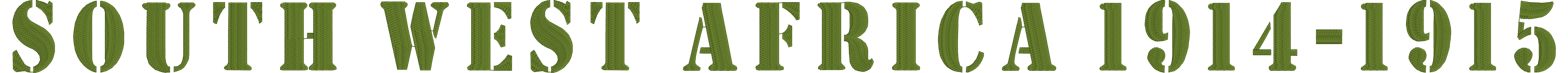
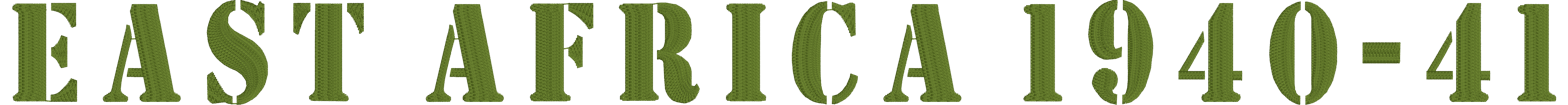
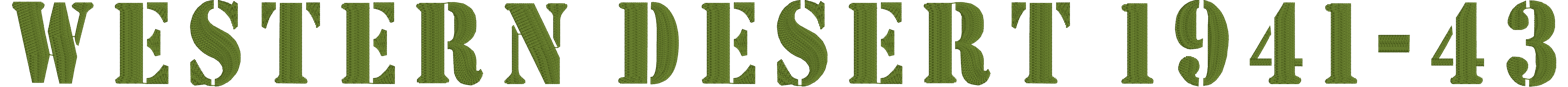
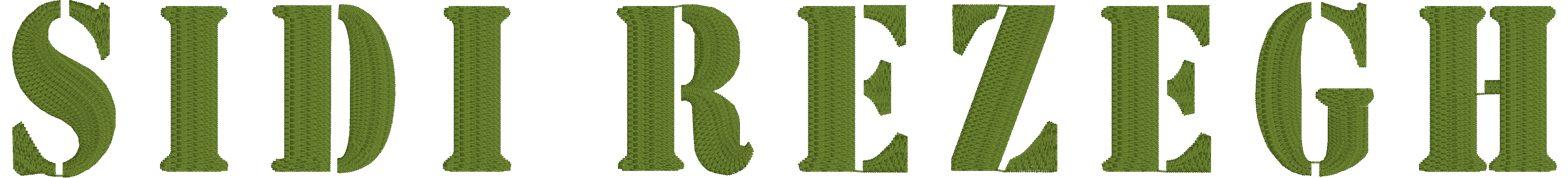

- South West Africa 1914 – 1915
- East Africa 1940 – 1941
- Mega
- Western Desert 1941 – 1943
- Sidi Rezegh

Note: As the regiment was virtually wiped out during the fighting at Sidi Rezegh in November 1941, no further World War II Battle Honours were awarded.

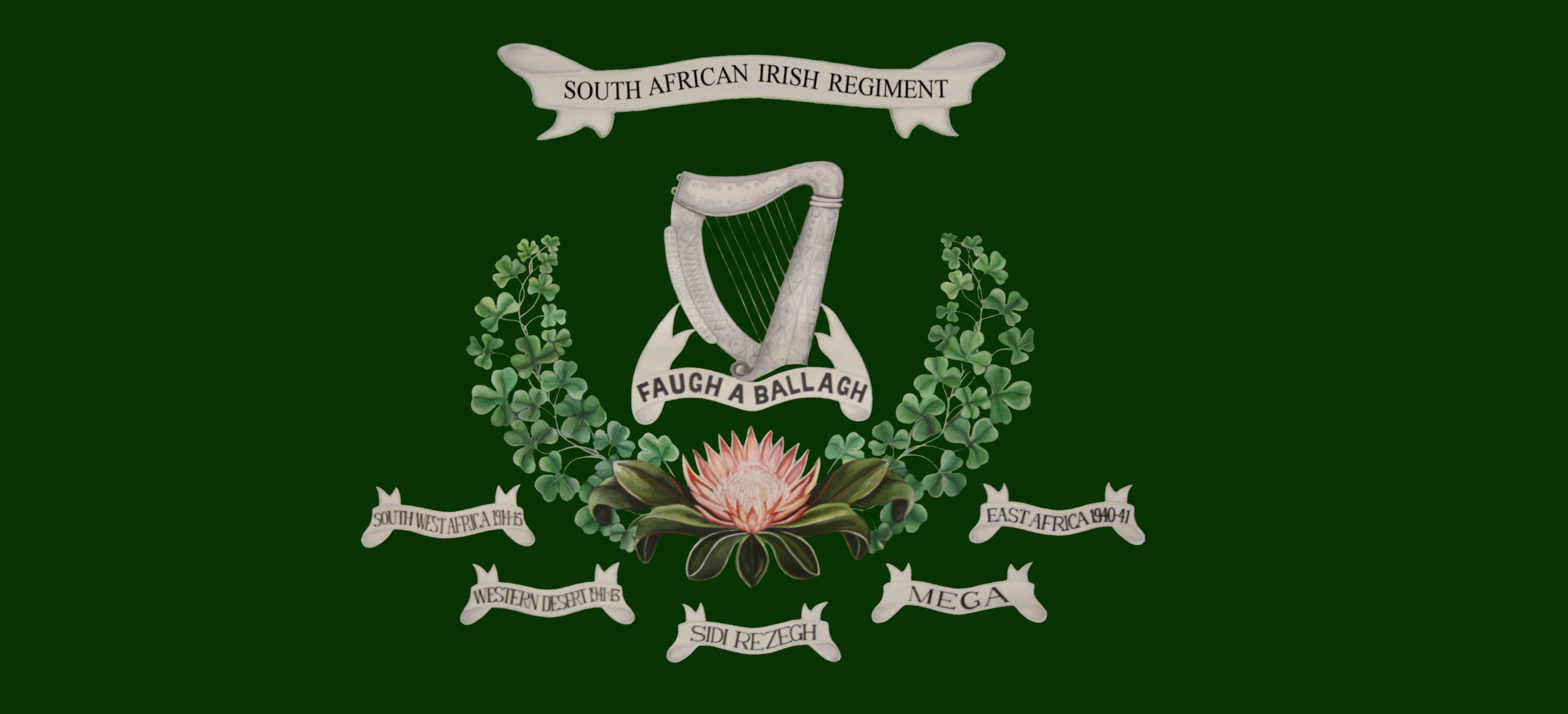
Regiment Battle Honours

== Leadership ==
- Honorary Colonel: Colonel B. Molefe
- Officer Commanding: Lieutenant Colonel M. P. Mkhize
- Second-in-Command: Major J.A. van Straaten JCD
- Adjutant: Lieutenant D.W. Chambers PS
- Regimental Sergeant-Major: Master Warrant Officer G.S. Moseki

Leadership
From	Honorary Colonel	To	Ribbon
1914	Col (Hon) (Mrs) Annie (Emmett) Botha (Note: Wife of Louis Botha)	1915	
1945	Col (Hon) T.W. Cullinan	1953	
1966	Col (Hon) W.J. Busschau	1976	
1977	Col (Hon) C.A. Twomey SM,JCD	1978	Southern Cross Medal SM John Chard Decoration JCD
2009	Col (Hon) Brian Molefe	Present	
From	Commanding Officers	To	Ribbon
1914	Lt Col F.H. Brennan VD	1915	Colonial Auxiliary Forces Officers' Decoration VD
1939	Lt Col J.A.M. Moreland MC	1940	Military Cross MC
1940	Lt Col D.I. Somerset MC	1940	Military Cross MC
1940	Lt Col J.F.K. Dobbs MC	1942	Military Cross MC
1942	Lt Col C. McN. Cochran DSO,MC	1942	Distinguished Service Order DSO Military Cross MC
1945	Lt Col F.H.G. Cochran OBE,ED	1951	Order of the British Empire OBE Efficiency Decoration (South Africa) ED
1951	Lt Col J. Geber DSO	1956	Distinguished Service Order DSO
1956	Cmdt C.A. Twomey SM,JCD	1964	Southern Cross Medal SM John Chard Decoration JCD
1965	Cmdt G. van Kerckhoven SM,JCD	1969	Southern Cross Medal SM John Chard Decoration JCD
1970	Cmdt E.M. Kristal JCD	1972	John Chard Decoration JCD
1972	Maj C.I. Steyn (Note: Temporary Commandant)	1975	
1975	Cmdt S.W.J. Kotze	1975	
1975	Cmdt J.C. Bosch	1980	
1980	Cmdt J.H. Swanepoel	1982	
1982	Cmdt S.H. Moir	1986	
1986	Cmdt A.J. Karcz	1988	
1988	Cmdt R. Joubert	1991	
1991	Lt Col G. Rothschild	1999	
1999	Lt Col J.P. Jonker	2005	
2005	Lt Col Tom Pounder	2005	
2005	Lt Col M.A. Bennett RD	2015	Medal Ribbon for Loyal Service - with RD device RD
2015	Lt Col W.W. Kinghorn MMM,DWD	2018	Military Merit Medal MMM De Wet Decoration DWD
2018	Lt Col M.P. Mkhize	Present	
From	Regimental Sergeants Major	To	Ribbon
1914	WO1 J. Murray DCM	1915	Distinguished Conduct Medal DCM
1939	WO1 R. Bowker	1940	
1940	WO1 E. Owen	1940	
1940	WO1 A.H. Brehem	1941	
1946	WO1 C.E. Whillier MM,EM	1955	Military Medal MM Efficiency Medal (South Africa) EM
1955	WO1 A. du Preez	1960	
1960	WO1 J. Bartman	1961	
1961	WO1 R. Parks	1962	
1962	WO1 P. Halroyd	1964	
1964	WO1 F. Ferreira	1966	
1967	WO1 J.L. Fitzhenry	1977	
1977	WO1 A.L. Day	1985	
1985	WO1 R.L. Olsen JCD	2007	John Chard Decoration JCD
2007	MWO G.S. Moseki	Present	
