= Rand Light Infantry =

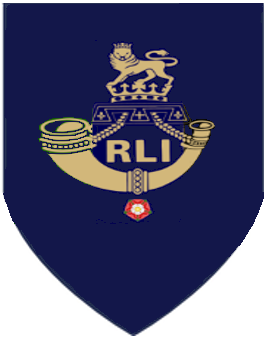
- SANDF Rand Light Infantry emblem
- Country: South Africa
- Allegiance: Republic of South Africa; Republic of South Africa
- Branch: South African Army; South African Army
- Type: Infantry
- Role: Light Infantry
- Part of: South African Infantry Formation; Army Conventional Reserve
- Mottos: Vincit qui patitur (He conquers who endures)
- March: Quick: One and All and Trelawney; Slow: Duke of York/Preobajensky; Double Time: Keel Row
- Engagements: World War I; World War II; South African Border War
- Battle honours: South West Africa 1914-1915; Western Desert 1941-43; Bardia; Gazala; El Alamein; Alamein Defence
- Website: http://1rli.wordpress.com/

Commanders
- Current commander: Lt Col John Mellitchey

Insignia
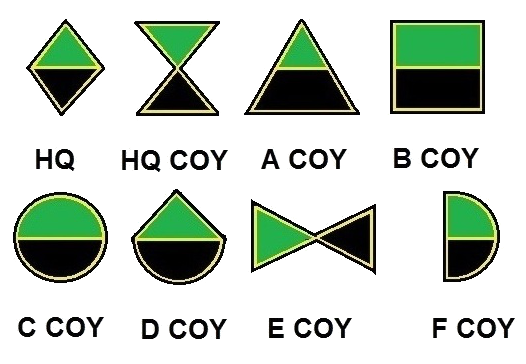
- Company level Insignia

- SA Motorised Infantry beret bar circa 1992: SA Motorised Infantry beret bar

The Rand Light Infantry (RLI) is an infantry regiment of the South African Army. As a reserve unit, it has a status roughly equivalent to that of a British Army Reserve unit or United States Army National Guard unit.

== History ==
=== Origin ===
The history of this regiment dates back to the Transvaal Cycle Corps, which was formed in Johannesburg on 1 October 1905 from the Bicycle Section of the Transvaal Scottish Regiment. A small section of this unit subsequently took part in the suppression of the Bambata Rebellion in Zululand.

After its return from this conflict the unit recognised the possibilities of mechanisation and members of the regiment manufactured three armoured cars, creating a motorised fighting unit. This led to the renaming of the unit in 1909 to the Transvaal Cycle and Motor Corps.

On 1 July 1913 the regiment was renamed the 11th Infantry (Rand Light Infantry) and transferred to the Active Citizen Force of the Union Defence Force. Simultaneously, the unit was converted to a normal infantry regiment. The regiment's Pretoria detachment was transferred to the 12th Infantry (Pretoria Regiment).

=== World War One ===
During World War I the regiment took part in the South-West Africa, suffering light casualties – only two dead and eleven wounded.

In 1932 the regiment was renamed the Rand Light Infantry.

=== World War Two ===
The RLI was mobilized for World War II in June 1940 and gained fame in North Africa where it took part in many front line engagements and earned battle honours at Bardia, Gazala and El Alamein. (See 1st SA Infantry Division) After the defeat of Rommel's Afrika Korps, the RLI returned to South Africa and was merged with the Duke of Edinburgh's Own Rifles. The remaining members of the regiment were trained in armour, and sent as reinforcements to the South African 6th Armoured Division in Italy.

=== Border War ===
The regiment took part in the South African Border War.

== Freedom of Entry ==
The RLI exercised its freedom of entry into Johannesburg on 9 November 2013 as part of the centenary celebrations of the City of Johannesburg with fixed bayonets, colours flying and drums beating.

== Regimental Symbols ==
- Regimental motto: Vincit qui patitur (He conquers who endures)
- The RLI were allied to the Duke of Cornwall's Light Infantry in 1932. This alliance later fell into abeyance but was resurrected in April 1995, when the regiment became allied with The Light Infantry Regiment
- Regimental March: One and All and Trelawney.
- Regimental slow march: Duke of York and Preobajensky March.
- Regimental double march: Keel Row.

=== Previous Dress Insignia ===
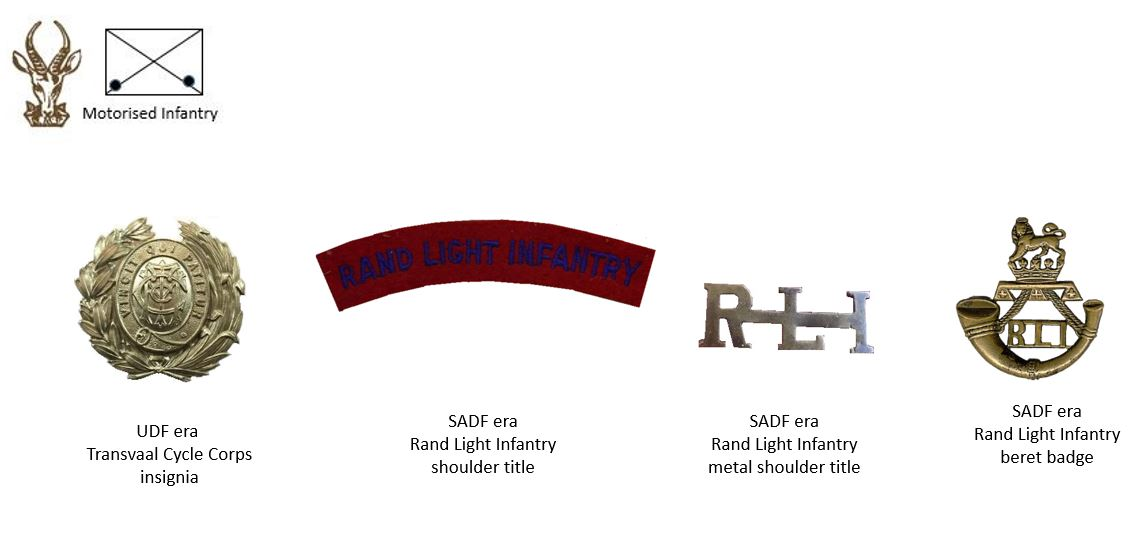
UDF and SADF eras Rand Light Infantry insignia

=== Current Dress Insignia ===
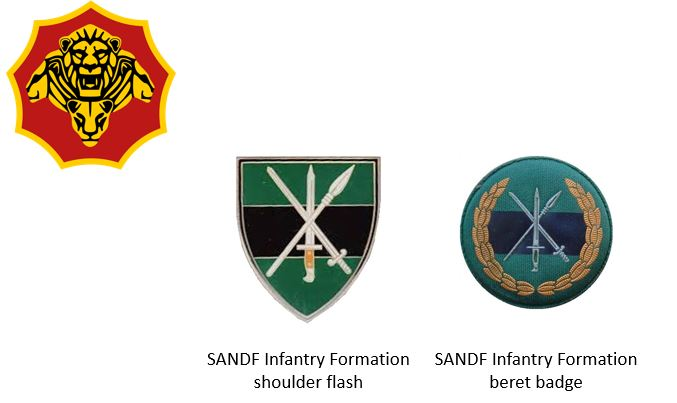
SANDF era Infantry Formation insignia

== Alliances ==
- United Kingdom – The Rifles

== Battle honours ==
The RLI has been awarded the following Battle Honours: South West Africa 1914-1915, Western Desert 1941 – 1943, Bardia, Gazala, El Alamein, Alamein Defence

Battle Honours
Awarded to Rand Light Infantry
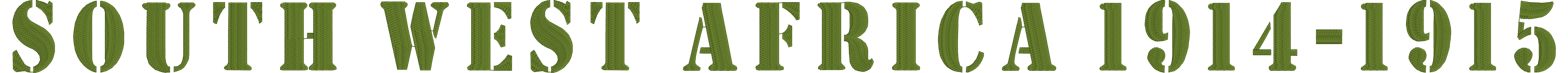
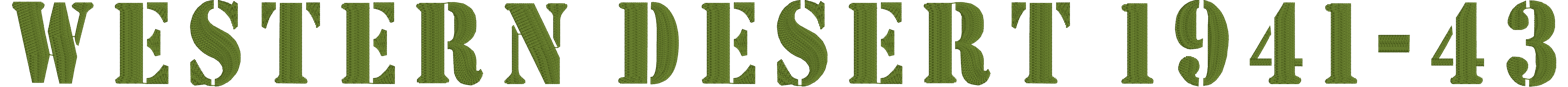
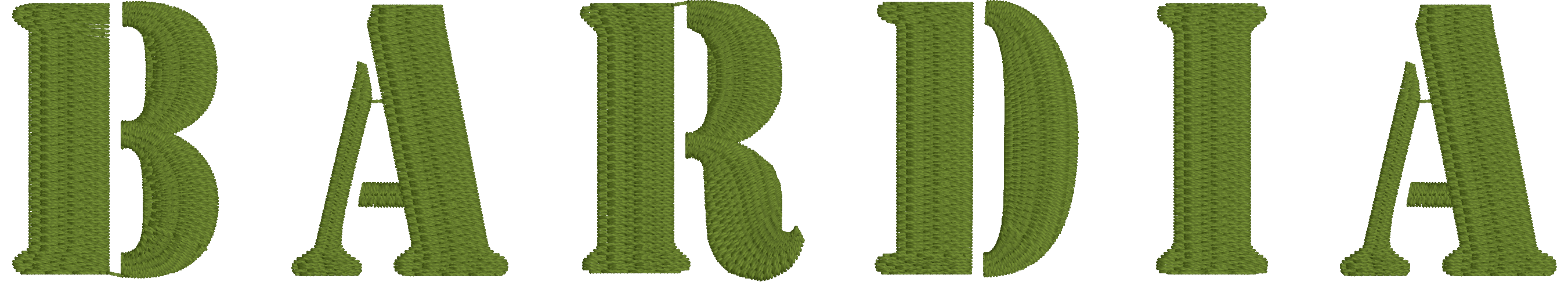
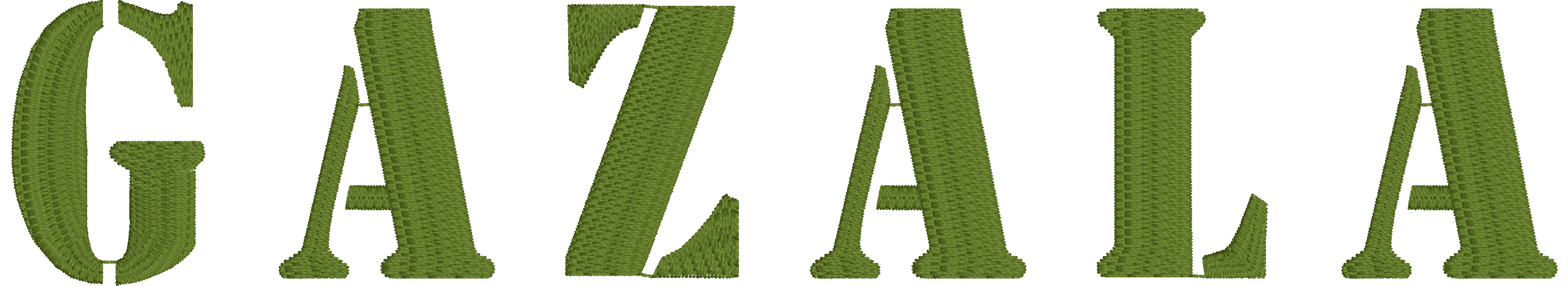
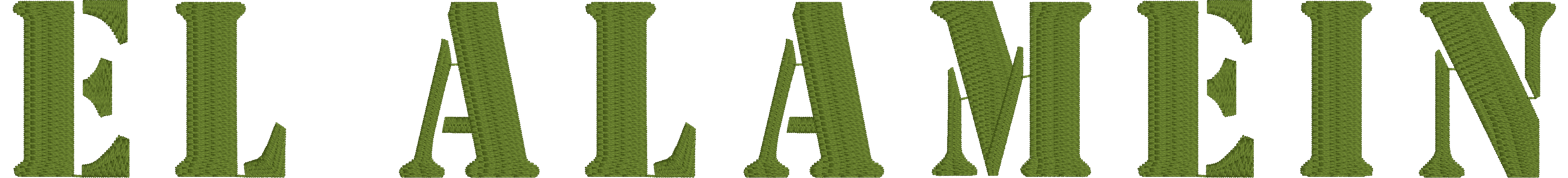
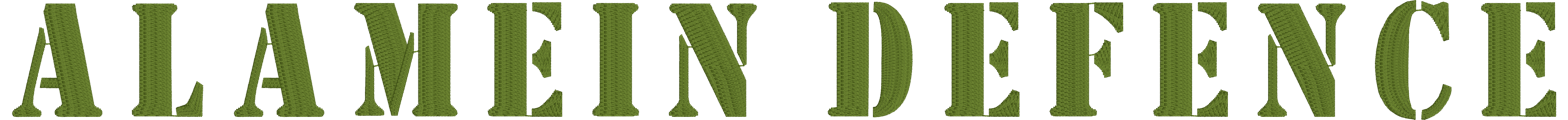

== Leadership ==
Leadership
From	Colonels in Chief	To	Ribbon
1906	Field Marshall, His Royal Highness, The Duke of Connaught KG,KT,GCMG,GCVO	1942	Order of the Garter KG Order of the Thistle KT Order of St Michael and St George GCMG Royal Victorian Order GCVO
1947	Her Royal Highness, The Princess Margaret	n.d.	
From	Honorary Colonels	To	Ribbon
1910	Col Sir William van Hulsteyn KT,VD	1939	Order of the Thistle KT Colonial Auxiliary Forces Officers' Decoration VD
1940	Col A.D. Viney	1968	
1971	Col G.B. Brown JCD,MC	1991	John Chard Decoration JCD Military Cross MC
1992	Col J.D.Vos SM,JCD	2012	Southern Cross Medal SM John Chard Decoration JCD
From	Commanding Officers	To	Ribbon
1905	Lt Col H.A. Woolf	1909	
1909	Lt Col G.H. Hamilton-Dickson MVO	1912	Royal Victorian Order MVO
1912	Lt Col J.M. Fairweather DSO	1915	Distinguished Service Order DSO
1915	Lt Col W.J. Thompson Croix de Guerre DSO,VD	1920	Distinguished Service Order DSO Colonial Auxiliary Forces Officers' Decoration VD
1920	Lt Col J.H. Blaney DSO,DCM	1922	Distinguished Service Order DSO Distinguished Conduct Medal DCM
1923	Lt Col W.A. Abbott VD	1925	Colonial Auxiliary Forces Officers' Decoration VD
1925	Lt Col W.A.D. Cherrington VD	1927	Colonial Auxiliary Forces Officers' Decoration VD
1927	Lt Col H.E. Jackson DCM,VD	1931	Distinguished Conduct Medal DCM Colonial Auxiliary Forces Officers' Decoration VD
1931	Lt Col W.J. Endean MC	1932	Military Cross MC
1932	Lt Col A.A. Hayton DSO,VD	1937	Distinguished Service Order DSO Colonial Auxiliary Forces Officers' Decoration VD
1937	Col J.O. Henrey MBE,VD	1942	Order of the British Empire MBE Colonial Auxiliary Forces Officers' Decoration VD
1942	Lt Col A.C. Thomas	1943	
1944	Amalgamated with CTR	1945	
1946	Lt Col C.D. Hancock ED	1950	Efficiency Decoration (South Africa) ED
1950	Cmdt W.P.F. Clark ED	1955	Efficiency Decoration (South Africa) ED
1955	Cmdt G.B. Brown JCD,MC	1962	John Chard Decoration JCD Military Cross MC
1963	Cmdt R.S. Munton JCD,MM	1966	John Chard Decoration JCD Military Medal MM
1967	Cmdt B.G. Simpkins JCD,MM	1969	John Chard Decoration JCD Military Medal MM
1969	Cmdt J.D. Vos SM,JCD	1975	Southern Cross Medal SM John Chard Decoration JCD
1975	Cmdt A.B. Dalgleish JCD	1977	John Chard Decoration JCD
1977	Cmdt J.M. Smuts JCD	1980	John Chard Decoration JCD
1981	Cmdt C.E. Story JCD	1983	John Chard Decoration JCD
1983	Cmdt Kevin G.E. Mulligan	1989	
1990	Cmdt B Durham	1991	
1992	Lt Col S.J.Vos MMM,JCD	2002	Military Merit Medal MMM John Chard Decoration JCD
2003	Lt Col Haydon Goument JCD	2005	John Chard Decoration JCD
2005	Lt Col John Mellitchey DWD	2016	De Wet Decoration DWD
From	Regimental Sergeants Major	To	Ribbon
1906	RSM E. Evans	1910	
1911	H.A.E. Hall	1914	
1914	S. Piggott	1917	
1918	A.H. Miller	1923	
1924	J.S. Porter	1925	
1925	D. Suttie	1925	
1925	R.G.B. Heydenrych	1928	
1929	H.R. Lahner	1942	
1942	G. Trobridge	1943	
1944	Amalgamated with CTR	1945	
1946	G.C. Webb	1947	
1948	V. Dove	1951	
1952	D.N. Rathbone	1962	
1963	E.L. Hansen	1964	
1964	WO1 J.H. Honey	1967	
1968	WO1 J.L. Keene PMM,JCD	1979	Pro Merito Medal PMM John Chard Decoration JCD
1980	WO1 S. Rogoff JCD	1984	John Chard Decoration JCD
1985	WO1 N.P. Wegener	1989.	
1990	WO1 PHR Wells MMM,JCD	2008	Military Merit Medal MMM John Chard Decoration JCD
