= Cadet Corps Medal =

Military medal of the Republic of South Africa

- Type: Military long service medal
- Awarded for: 20 years efficient service
- Country: South Africa
- Presented by: the State President
- Eligibility: Cadet Corps officers
- Clasps: 30 years service
- Status: Discontinued in 1986
- Established: 1966
- First award: 1967
- Final award: 1978

Highlights
- Total: 95
- Ribbon bar

SADF pre-1994 & SANDF post-2002 orders of wear
- Next (higher): SADF precedence: De Wet Decoration; SANDF precedence: De Wet Decoration
- Next (lower): SADF succession: Good Service Medal, Silver; SANDF succession: Good Service Medal, Silver

The Cadet Corps Medal is a military medal which was instituted by the Republic of South Africa in 1966. It could be awarded to officers in the School Cadet Corps for twenty years efficient service. A clasp could be awarded after 30 years qualifying service.

== The South African military ==
The Union Defence Forces (UDF) were established in 1912 and renamed the South African Defence Force (SADF) in 1958. On 27 April 1994, it was integrated with six other independent forces into the South African National Defence Force (SANDF).

== Institution ==
Prior to 1966, uniformed members serving in the Cadet Corps of the South African Defence Force were not rewarded for long and loyal service by means of a medal. The only existing medals for long service until then were the Permanent Force Good Service Medal and, for the Citizen Force, the John Chard Decoration and John Chard Medal. The De Wet Decoration for the Commandos was only instituted a year earlier, in 1965.

This was corrected on 19 August 1966, upon the institution of the Cadet Corps Medal by the State President. It was one of a few new decorations and medals which were introduced during the mid-1960s, in addition to the ten awards which had been instituted in 1952, to increase the range of possible awards for serving members.

== Award criteria ==
The Cadet Corps Medal could be awarded to officers in the School Cadet Corps for twenty years efficient service, which did not have to be continuous. A clasp could be awarded after 30 years qualifying service.

The first awards of the Cadet Corps Medal were promulgated in South African Defence Force Order 134/67 on 24 November 1967. After 1967, it was awarded to deserving officers in the Cadet Corps annually.

In August 1976, the SADF transferred all serving officers in the Cadet Corps to either the Citizen Force or the Commandos. Since they now became eligible for the long service awards of either of these two elements of the Force, depending on which one they were integrated into, the requirement for the Cadet Corps Medal lapsed and it became obsolete. The award of the medal was consequently discontinued in respect of Cadet Corps officers who reached the qualifying period of service after August 1976. The final award of the Cadet Corps Medal was promulgated in 1978 in South African Defence Force General Order 60/78.

Between 1967 and 1978, the Cadet Corps Medal was awarded to 95 officers. Three clasps to the Cadet Corps Medal were awarded, two in 1968 and one in 1971.

== Order of wear ==
The position of the Cadet Corps Medal in the official order of precedence was revised three times, to accommodate the inclusion or institution of new decorations and medals, first upon the integration into the South African National Defence Force on 27 April 1994, again when decorations and medals were belatedly instituted in April 1996 for the two former non-statutory forces, the Azanian People's Liberation Army and Umkhonto we Sizwe, and again when a new series of military decorations and medals was instituted in South Africa on 27 April 2003, but it remained unchanged on all three occasions.

Official SANDF order of precedence

- Preceded by the De Wet Decoration (DWD) of the Republic of South Africa.
- Succeeded by the Good Service Medal, Silver of the Republic of South Africa.

Official national order of precedence

- Preceded by the De Wet Decoration (DWD) of the Republic of South Africa.
- Succeeded by the Good Service Medal, Silver of the Republic of South Africa.

== Description ==
Obverse

The Cadet Corps Medal is a medallion struck in silver, 3 millimetres thick and 38 millimetres in diameter, with a raised rim, depicting the prancing springbok emblem of the School Cadet Corps of the South African Defence Force, surrounded by a wreath of proteas and inscribed "CADET CORPS MEDAL" at left and "KADETKORPSMEDALJE" at right.

Reverse

The reverse has a raised rim and displays the pre-2000 South African Coat of Arms.

Ribbon

The ribbon is 32 millimetres wide, with an 8 millimetres wide dark blue band and a 1½ millimetres wide white band, repeated in reverse order and separated by a 13 millimetres wide orange band. Orange, white and dark blue were the colours of the pre-1994 South African flag.

Clasp

The clasp was struck in silver and had the prancing springbok emblem embossed in the centre.

== Status ==
The Cadet Corps Medal became obsolete in August 1976, when the Cadet Corps was absorbed into the Citizen Force and the Commandos. The medal was officially discontinued ten years later in 1986.
