= Pietersburg Commando =

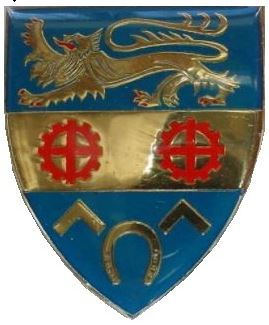
- Pietersburg Commando emblem
- Country: South Africa
- Allegiance: (South African Republic) Zuid Afrikaanse Republiek; Union of South Africa; Republic of South Africa; Republic of South Africa
- Branch: South African Army; South African Army
- Type: Infantry
- Role: Light Infantry
- Size: One Battalion
- Part of: South African Infantry Corps; Army Territorial Reserve, Group 14
- Garrison/HQ: Pietersburg

Pietersburg Commando was a light infantry regiment of the South African Army. It formed part of the South African Army Infantry Formation as well as the South African Territorial Reserve.

== History ==
=== Operations ===
==== With the Zuid Afrikaanse Republiek ====
During the Anglo Boer War, a commando from Pietersburg used harassing tactics to tie up British allies in the Bechuanaland protectorate. The Ngwato Tswana people were allied to the British. The Boer commando sided with Chief Kgama's son Sekhoma causing dissension. This caused the chief to use his forces at home and tied down around 3000 Tswana men in Bechuanland that could have been used in the Transvaal.

==== With the UDF ====
By 1902 all Commando remnants were under British military control and disarmed.

By 1912, however previous Commando members could join shooting associations.

By 1940, such commandos were under control of the National Reserve of Volunteers.

These commandos were formally reactivated by 1948.

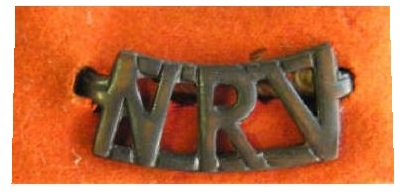
UDF era National Reserve of Volunteers shoulder tab

==== With the SADF ====
The unit resorted under the command of Group 14.

During this era, the unit was mainly used for area force protection, search and cordones as well as stock theft control assistance to the rural police.

==== With the SANDF ====
===== Disbandment =====
This unit, along with all other Commando units was disbanded after a decision by South African President Thabo Mbeki to disband all Commando Units. The Commando system was phased out between 2003 and 2008 "because of the role it played in the apartheid era", according to the Minister of Safety and Security Charles Nqakula.

== Unit Insignia ==
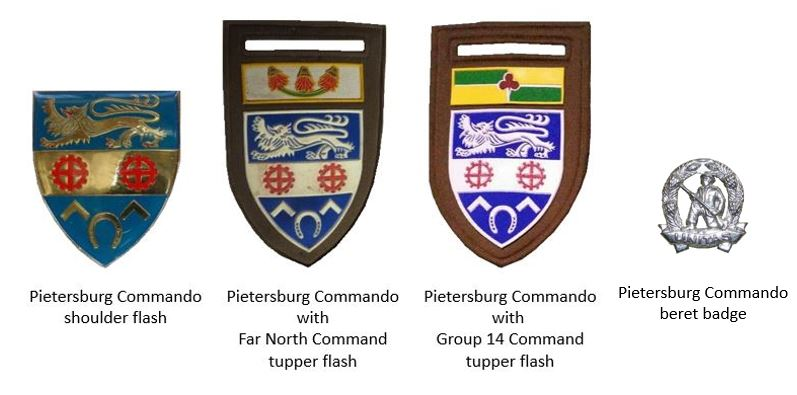
SADF era Pietersburg Commando insignia

== Leadership ==
Leadership
| From | Honorary Colonels | To | Ribbon |
|---|---|---|---|
| XXX | XXX | XXX | |
| From | Commanding Officers | To | Ribbon |
| 1996 | Col Ferdi van Rooyen | 2003 | |
| From | Regimental Sergeants Major | To | Ribbon |
| XXX | XXX MMM,JCD | XXX | Military Merit Medal MMM John Chard Decoration JCD |

== See also ==
- South African Commando System
