= Royal Irish Rangers =

Royal Irish Rangers (27th (Inniskilling) 83rd & 87th)
- Active: 1 July 1968 – 1992
- Country: United Kingdom
- Branch: British Army
- Type: Light infantry
- Size: On disbandment, 2 Regular battalions & 1 TA Battalion
- Garrison/HQ: St Patrick's Barracks, Ballymena
- Nickname: "Rangers"
- Motto: Faugh A Ballagh (Irish) (Clear the Way)
- Colours: Green; From Royal Irish Fusiliers
- March: Quick: Killaloe; Slow: Eileen Alannagh
- Mascot: Irish Wolfhound Brian Boru
- Anniversaries: Barrosa Day, 5 March; Somme Day, Waterloo Day, Rangers Day 1 July
- Engagements: Barrosa; Waterloo; Somme

Commanders
- Colonel in Chief: First: Field Marshal Prince Henry, Duke of Gloucester, Earl of Ulster; Last: The Duchess of Gloucester (1989 - until amalgamation)
- Honorary Colonel: First - Lieutenant General Sir Ian Harris. Last - Lt. Col. The 3rd Viscount Brookeborough
- Notable commanders: General Sir Roger Wheeler, GCB, CBE. Former CGS; Brigadier MCV McCord MC; The O'Morochoe

Insignia
- Abbreviation: R.IRISH

The Royal Irish Rangers (27th (Inniskilling), 83rd and 87th) was a regular light infantry regiment of the British Army with a relatively short existence, formed in 1968 and later merged with the Ulster Defence Regiment in 1992 to form the Royal Irish Regiment.

== History ==
=== Creation ===
The Royal Irish Rangers came into being on 1 July 1968 through the amalgamation of the three regiments of the North Irish Brigade: the Royal Inniskilling Fusiliers, the Royal Ulster Rifles and the Royal Irish Fusiliers. The date was initially known as "Vesting Day" (and then "Rangers Day"), emphasising that the traditions of the old regiments were "vested" in the new large regiment. Soon after creation in December 1968, and as part of a general reduction in the Army, the 3rd Battalion (former Royal Irish Fusiliers) was disbanded. The three regiments had old and differing traditions (Rifle and Fusilier) and to avoid favouring one above another, the unique designation "Rangers" was adopted. The title had not existed in the British Army since 1922. With the creation of the "Divisions of Infantry", the Royal Irish Rangers became part of the King's Division, along with regiments from the north of England.

=== Deployments ===
The 1st Battalion moved to Barrosa Barracks in Hemer, Germany in September 1970 from where units were deployed to Cyprus on peacekeeping duties in November 1971. The battalion returned home in July 1974 where it was stationed in Battlesbury Barracks in Warminster it became the infantry demonstration Battalion. Two years later it moved to RAF Little Rissington in the Cotswolds, before being sent to Berlin in May 1979. After returning home in April 1981 the battalion moved to Chester bfor 2 yrs before moving to Belfast Barracks in Osnabrück in January 1985. The battalion undertook a deployment to Northern Ireland during the Troubles in September 1988.

The 2nd Battalion, which had been based in Gibraltar on formation, returned home in October 1969. It moved to Barrosa Barracks in Hemer in July 1974 from where it deployed to Cyprus in January 1975. After returning home in March 1979, it moved to Wavell Barracks in Berlin in October 1981 and back to England in March 1983. It deployed to Cyprus in May 1985 and to the Falkland Islands in March 1987.

=== Options for change ===
Under the Options for Change reorganisation, the Royal Irish Rangers were amalgamated with the Ulster Defence Regiment to form the new Royal Irish Regiment (27th (Inniskilling) 83rd and 87th and Ulster Defence Regiment) in 1992.

== Uniform ==
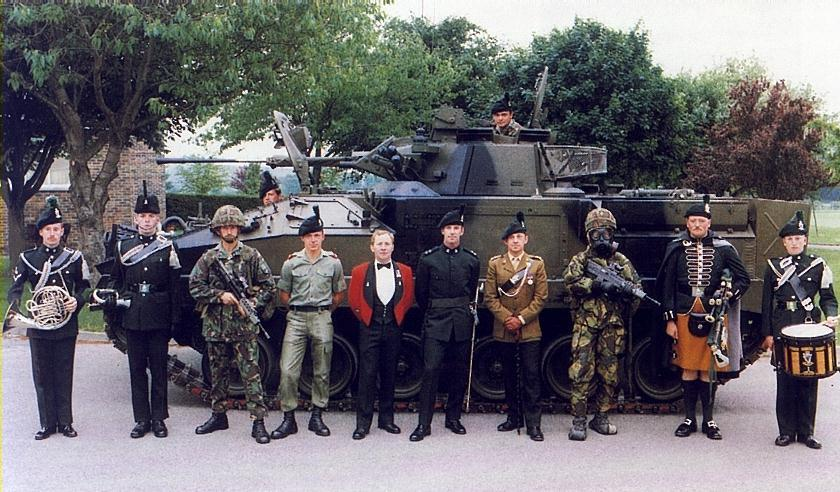
Ranger uniforms

Accommodating the traditions of the three regiments required compromise:

- The caubeen was adopted as the headdress for the new Regiment as all the former regiments had worn it
- The green hackle was formerly worn by the Royal Irish Fusiliers
- The Castle collar badges had been worn by the Royal Inniskilling Fusiliers
- The black buttons had been worn by the Royal Ulster Rifles
- The brown cross belt was a compromise between the brown Sam Browne belts worn by the Fusiliers and the black cross belt worn in the Rifles

In addition all ranks of the new regiment were to wear 'piper green' trousers.

== Territorial Army ==
The Territorial battalions formed the 4th Battalion Royal Irish Rangers (North Irish Militia) which also included the sole London Irish Rifles company and the 5th Battalion Royal Irish Rangers. The two TA battalions trained as units until 1993 when following the Options for Change White Paper, they were merged to form the 4/5th Battalion Royal Irish Rangers (Volunteers).

== Roll of honour ==
=== Post 1968 ===
- 21 May 1972. Ranger William J Best – 1 R IRISH. A 19-year-old on leave from Germany, abducted from his mother's home in Derry and killed by the OIRA.
- 19 July 1972. Staff Sergeant Talaiasi Labalaba BEM, MID – 2 R IRISH (attached 22 SAS). During Battle of Mirbat in Oman.
- 23 March 1974. Major D P Farrell MBE – 1 R IRISH (Retired). Shot dead by the OIRA when he was walking his dog near his home in Mountfield, near Omagh, County Tyrone.
- 12 April 1974. Captain S Garthwaite MID - attached 22 SAS. Oman.
- 6 December 1977. Ranger Charles George McLaughlin and Ranger Hugh Thompson - 1 R IRISH. Died on Fire Fighting duties in Manchester during the firemen's strike.
- 28 December 1980. Warrant Officer Hugh McGinn – 5 (V) R IRISH. Shot by the Irish National Liberation Army at the door of his home in Armagh.
- 13 April 1983. Sergeant Trevor A Elliot - 5(V) R IRISH. Shot by Provisional Irish Republican Army (PIRA) in Keady.
- 9 May 1984. Corporal Trevor May - 4(V) R IRISH. Killed in Newry when an Improvised explosive device placed under a car exploded.
- 9 October 1989. Lance Corporal Tommy Gibson – 4(V) R IRISH. Killed by PIRA in Kilrea.
- 24 October 1990. Ranger Cyril J Smith QGM - 2 R IRISH. Killed when attempting to release a man tied to a proxy bomb - his car - driven into a Border checkpoint at Killeen near Newry. The man's family were held hostage in their home.
- 17 January 1992. Ranger Robert Dunseath – 4 R IRISH. Killed in a roadside bomb attack at Teebane Crossroads, near Cookstown, County Tyrone, while on a civilian bus carrying workers from Lisanelly army barracks at Omagh.

== Music of the regiment ==
The Regimental Quick March is Killaloe. It was written around 1887 by an Irish composer, Robert Martin, for the London Musical "Miss Esmeralda". The lyrics relate the story of a French teacher attempting to make himself understood to a difficult Killaloe class. Originally in 2/4 time, it was made well known in military circles by a cousin of the composer - Lt. Charles Martin of the 88th Connaught Rangers (The Devil's Own). He composed new lyrics, in 6/8 time, celebrating his Regiment's fame. No mention is made of the tune in the Regimental history, but there is an explanation that may account for the shout or yell in the military version of Killaloe.

Historically, in the 1st Battalion (Connaught Rangers), formerly the 88th, a favourite march tune was "Brian Boru" played when marching through a town - often after a hot and heavy march. On such occasions, and at a time given by the sergeant major, the band would pause and all ranks would give a "Connaught yell". The march became popular among the other Irish regiments and various other sets of lyrics were devised. On parade, soldiers of the Royal Irish Rangers gave a spine-tingling "Ranger yell"; this continues with the Royal Irish Regiment.

The first known recording of Killaloe was made by Richard Dimbleby when serving as a BBC war correspondent in Northern France shortly before Dunkirk. The "Famous Irish Regiment" Dimbleby reports playing as they march past is not named, but would have been either the Royal Irish Fusiliers or the Royal Inniskilling Fusiliers.

Again in 1944, the BBC recorded the 1st Battalion, Royal Inniskilling Fusiliers Pipes & Drums playing Killaloe, by then adopted unofficially as the march of the 38th (Irish) Brigade, during the approach to Monte Cassino. Killaloe was adopted by the Royal Irish Rangers on its formation and again later by the Royal Irish Regiment on its amalgamation in 1992.

=== Lyrics ===
The soldiers often put their own words to the tune which would be sung, sotto voce, as they marched:

(Oh) We're the Irish Rangers,

The boys who fear no danger,
We're the boys from Paddy's land
YO!

Shut up you buggers and fight

== Lineage ==
Lineage
The Royal Irish Rangers (27th (Inniskilling) 83rd and 87th)	The Royal Inniskilling Fusiliers	The 27th (Inniskilling) Regiment of Foot
The Royal Irish Rangers (27th (Inniskilling) 83rd and 87th)	The Royal Inniskilling Fusiliers	The 108th Regiment of Foot (Madras Infantry)
The Royal Irish Rangers (27th (Inniskilling) 83rd and 87th)	The Royal Ulster Rifles	The 83rd (County of Dublin) Regiment of Foot
The Royal Irish Rangers (27th (Inniskilling) 83rd and 87th)	The Royal Ulster Rifles	The 86th (Royal County Down) Regiment of Foot
The Royal Irish Rangers (27th (Inniskilling) 83rd and 87th)	The Royal Irish Fusiliers (Princess Victoria's)	The 87th (Royal Irish Fusiliers) Regiment of Foot
The Royal Irish Rangers (27th (Inniskilling) 83rd and 87th)	The Royal Irish Fusiliers (Princess Victoria's)	The 89th (The Princess Victoria's) Regiment of Foot

== Regimental Colonels ==
Colonels of the Regiment were:

- 1968–1972: Lt-Gen. Sir Ian Cecil Harris, KBE, CB, DSO (ex Royal Ulster Rifles)
- 1972–1977: Maj-Gen. James Herbert Samuel Majury, CB, MBE
- 1977–1979: Maj-Gen. David N.C. (O'Morchoe), The O'Morchoe, CB, MBE
- 1979–1985: Maj-Gen. Humphrey Edgar Nicholson Bredin, DSO, MC
- 1985–1990: Brig. Mervyn Noel Samuel McCord, CBE, MC, AMBIM
- 1990–1992: Gen. Sir Roger Neil Wheeler, GCB, CBE, ADC

*1992 Regiment amalgamated with Ulster Defence Regiment to form the Royal Irish Regiment

== See also ==
- Army Ranger Wing
