= Irish Rifles =

Irish Rifles may refer to:

- Royal Ulster Rifles
- London Irish Rifles
- Cape Town Irish Volunteer Rifles
- 37th New York Volunteer Infantry Regiment
