= Phalaborwa Commando =

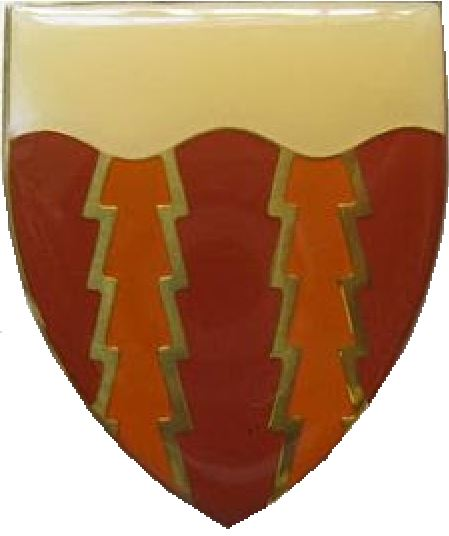
- Phalaborwa Commando emblem
- Country: South Africa
- Allegiance: Republic of South Africa; Republic of South Africa
- Branch: South African Army; South African Army
- Type: Infantry
- Role: Light Infantry
- Size: One Battalion
- Part of: South African Infantry Corps; Army Territorial Reserve, Group 13
- Garrison/HQ: Phalaborwa

Phalaborwa Commando was a light infantry regiment of the South African Army. It formed part of the South African Army Infantry Formation as well as the South African Territorial Reserve.

== History ==
=== Operations ===
==== With the SADF ====
During this era the unit was mainly utilised for area force protection, search and cordones as well as stock theft control assistance to the local police.

The unit resorted under the command of Group 13.

==== With the SANDF ====
===== Disbandment =====
This unit, along with all other Commando units was disbanded after a decision by South African President Thabo Mbeki to disband all Commando Units. The Commando system was phased out between 2003 and 2008 "because of the role it played in the apartheid era", according to the Minister of Safety and Security Charles Nqakula.

== Unit Insignia ==
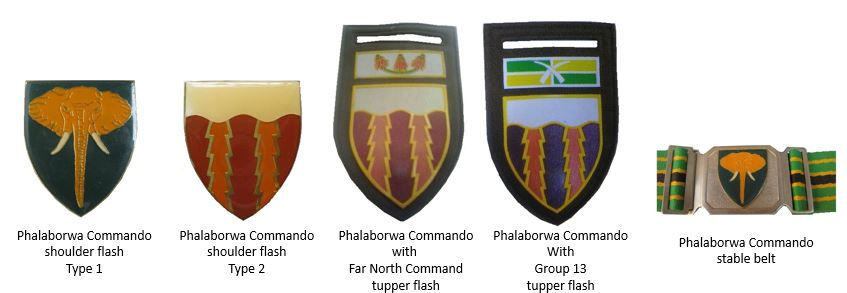
SADF Phalaborwa Commando insignia

== Leadership ==
Leadership
From	Honorary Colonels	To	Ribbon
XXX	XXX	XXX	
From	Commanding Officers	To	Ribbon
1970	Kommandant L.H.Verhoef	1973	
From	Regimental Sergeants Major	To	Ribbon
XXX	XXX MMM,JCD	XXX	Military Merit Medal MMM John Chard Decoration JCD

== See also ==
- South African Commando System
