= John Eustace (disambiguation) =

John Eustace is an English footballer.

John Eustace may also refer to:

- John Chetwode Eustace, Anglo-Irish Catholic priest and antiquary
- John Skey Eustace, colonel in the Continental Army in the American Revolution, and general in the French Revolutionary army
- John Thomas Eustace, member of the Parliament of the Cape of Good Hope
