= David O'Morchoe =

British Army general (1928–2019)

Major-General David O'Morchoe CB CBE
- Born: 11 May 1928; Dublin, Ireland
- Died: 22 November 2019 (aged 91); Gorey, Ireland
- Military career
- Allegiance: United Kingdom
- Branch: British Army
- Service years: 1946–1979
- Rank: Major-General
- Commands: Royal Army of Oman; 3rd Battalion, Royal Irish Rangers; 1st Battalion, Royal Irish Fusiliers
- Conflicts: Mau Mau Uprising; United Nations Peacekeeping Force in Cyprus
- Awards: Companion of the Order of the Bath; Commander of the Order of the British Empire; Knight of the Order of Saint Lazarus

Major-General David Nial Creagh, The O'Morchoe, CB, CBE (17 May 1928 – 22 November 2019), also known as David O'Morchoe, was a British Army officer. The O'Morchoe was a President of the Royal British Legion branch in the Republic of Ireland, and also President of the Leinster Regiment historical association and President of the Tipperary Remembrance Trust. He was the hereditary Chief and Prince of the Ó Murchadha (Murphy/Morrow) Sept, a cadet line of the ancient Irish dynasty the Uí Cheinnselaig, who were Kings of Leinster.

== Early life ==
David Nial Creagh O'Morchoe was the son of Nial Creagh O'Morchoe (d. 1970), an Indian Army officer who had succeeded his brother Arthur (a County Wexford farmer, formerly of the Colonial Service) as The O'Morchoe.

== Military career ==
O'Morchoe joined the British Army in 1946 and was commissioned from Royal Military Academy Sandhurst as an officer in Royal Irish Fusiliers. He was appointed a Companion of the Order of the Bath in the 1979 Birthday Honours, and retired with the rank of major general later the same year.

== Ó Murchadha clan chief and later life ==
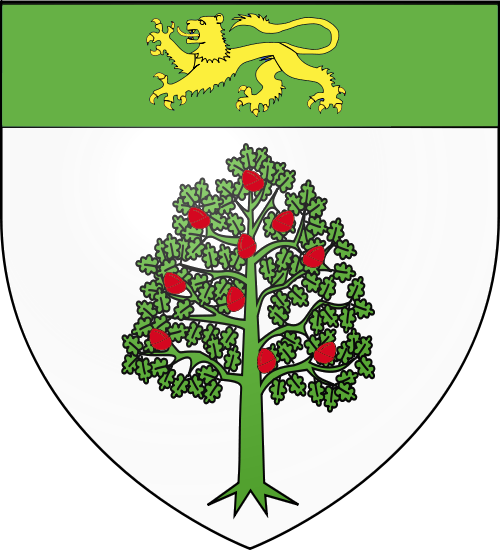
Ó Murchadh.

O'Morchoe was a prominent figure, who represented The Royal British Legion at the Irish National Day of Commemoration ceremonies held annually in the Royal Hospital in Kilmainham to honour Irish men and women who died in past wars or in service with the United Nations. From 6 to 11 June 2007, The O'Morchoe represented the Association during the commemoration ceremonies in Belgium.

O'Morchoe was appointed a Commander of the Order of the British Empire in the Diplomatic Service and Overseas List of the 2007 New Year Honours "for services to British ex-servicemen and women in Ireland". In September 2010, he was invested Knight of the Order of Saint Lazarus. In September 2014 he was suspended from his position in the Royal British Legion.

== Personal life ==
O'Morchoe married Margaret Brewitt, of Cork; they had three children: Dermot (the tanist); Kevin; and Maureen.

== Death ==
O'Morchoe died at his home in Gorey on 22 November 2019, at the age of 91. A reception service was held in Kiltennel parish church on 24 November, followed by a funeral in Christ Church, Gorey on the following day.

== See also ==
- Gaelic nobility of Ireland
- Chief of the Name
