= Chief Langalibalele Rifles =

Cape Rifle Corps Cape Royal Rifles Cape Town Volunteer Rifles Duke of Edinburgh's Own Rifles Cape Town Rifles Chief Langalibalele Rifles
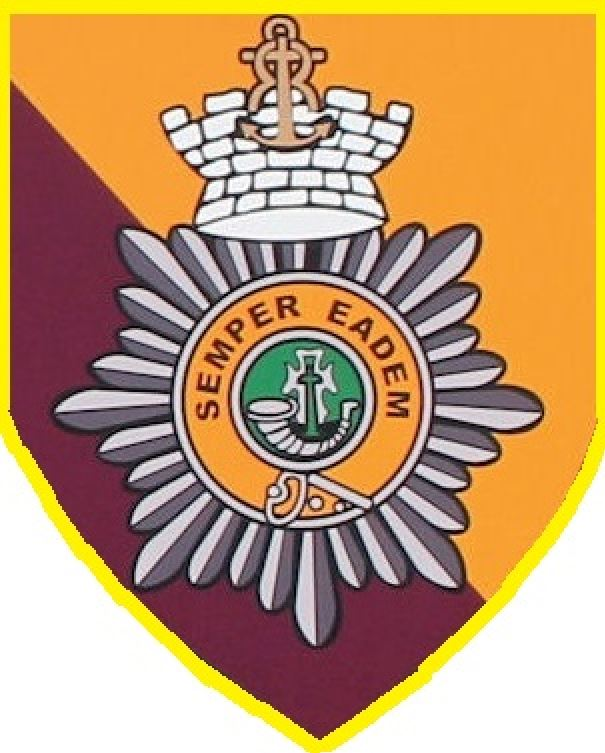
- SANDF Cape Town Rifles emblem
- Founded: 28 November 1855; 170 years ago
- Country: South Africa
- Branch: South African Army
- Type: Infantry
- Role: Amphibious Motorised infantry
- Size: One battalion
- Part of: South African Infantry Formation; Army Conventional Reserve
- Garrison/HQ: Cape Town
- Motto: Semper Eadem
- Anniversaries: 28 November (Regimental Day)

Commanders
- Current commander: Lt Col Francois Marais MMM, B Mil
- Honorary Colonel: Colonel Les Masterson

Insignia
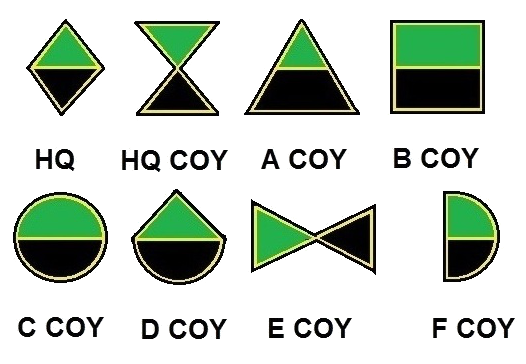
- Company level Insignia

- SA Motorised Infantry beret bar circa 1992: SA Motorised Infantry beret bar
- Abbreviation: CLR

The Chief Langalibalele Rifles (formerly known as the Cape Town Rifles and Duke of Edinburgh's Own Rifles) is a reserve infantry regiment of the South African Army.

== History ==
=== Origin ===
The Regiment was founded on 28 November 1855, as the Cape Rifle Corps. It was the first volunteer unit in the Cape Colony.

=== Other names ===
It was also known as the Cape Royal Rifles, and later as the Cape Town Volunteer Rifles.

=== Association with Prince Alfred ===
On 30 September 1867, Prince Alfred, Duke of Edinburgh granted the CTVR the title the Duke of Edinburgh's Own Rifles, after it had formed a guard of honour for him during a visit to Cape Town. The nickname "the Dukes" appears to have come into use in the 1880s.

=== Role ===
The Regiment's original purpose was home defence, to supplement the British Army garrison which was stationed in Cape Town. It initially consisted of two companies, but later grew to five, the fifth (formed in 1859) being a Scottish company. The Scottish company left the Regiment, and became a unit in its own right, in 1861, and disbanded in 1866. During the depression of the 1860s and early 1870s, the Regiment shrank to only one company, and was one of the few volunteer units to remain in existence

=== Early Campaigns ===
On the outbreak of the 9th Frontier War in 1877, the Regiment volunteered for active service, and fielded a small contingent which served in the Transkei from October 1877 to January 1878. Hundreds of volunteers joined the Regiment, and it was reorganised in April 1878, into six companies.

Another contingent served in the Transkei from February to May 1879, to take the place of a British garrison unit which had been re-deployed to Zululand because of the Anglo-Zulu War.

Half the Regiment served in the Basutoland Gun War in Basutoland (now Lesotho) from September 1880 to March 1881, and it was there that the Regiment suffered its first casualties.

The Regiment continued to grow after this period of campaigning, and a new Scottish company was formed in 1882. It transferred to the newly formed Cape Town Highlanders in July 1885. In 1891, the Dukes took over the Cape Town Irish Volunteer Rifles, and in 1894 the Regiment formed a mounted company.

From February to August 1897, the Dukes were on active service in Bechuanaland, as part of a government military operation to capture dissident Tswana leaders who had taken refuge in the Langberg mountains.

=== Anglo-Boer War ===
The Regiment played an active role in the Anglo-Boer War (1899–1902). Initially, it was deployed to protect a long stretch of the railway line through the Western Cape. In May 1900, it was assigned to Lt Gen Sir Charles Warren's column, to recapture areas of Griqualand West from Boer and Cape Rebel forces. The Dukes' commanding officer, Lt Col William Spence, was killed in action during a Boer attack on the column's base on the farm Fabers Puts on 30 May 1900.

From June 1900 until the end of the war in May 1902, the Regiment was split up into small detachments, which manned outposts and blockhouses in the northern Cape.

A second battalion was formed in Cape Town in January 1901, and in October 1901 it became a separate unit and was renamed the Colonial Light Horse. It disbanded after the end of the war.

=== Citizen Force ===
Together with most colonial volunteer units, the Dukes were embodied in the Active Citizen Force of the new Union Defence Force on 1 July 1913. The word "volunteer" was removed from the title, which then became "2nd Infantry (Duke of Edinburgh's Own Rifles)". The numerical designation was dropped in 1932.

=== World War I ===
Like other CF units, the Dukes played a limited role in World War I, because the South African forces were restricted to operations in southern Africa. The Regiment was on garrison duty in Cape Town from October 1914 to January 1915, and was deployed in German South West Africa (now Namibia) from February to July 1915. It was used in a supporting role, and saw no action.

After the Dukes returned from GSWA, more than a hundred members volunteered for service in the new 1st SA Infantry Regiment, which served in Egypt and then on the Western Front in France. Some others volunteered for service in the British forces, and one "Duke", Andrew Beauchamp-Proctor, became a Royal Air Force pilot and finished the war as South Africa's most highly decorated serviceman ever.

=== World War II ===
The Dukes served again in World War II. As a unit of the 1st SA Infantry Brigade, the Regiment served in East Africa (Kenya, Somaliland and Ethiopia) from July 1940 to May 1941, and in North Africa (Egypt and Libya) from June 1941 to December 1942 as part of the 1st SA Infantry Division. The Dukes earned eleven battle honours in these two campaigns.

From February 1943 to March 1945, the Regiment was based in the Transvaal, in South Africa, as a tank training battalion. Being under-strength, it was temporarily amalgamated with the Rand Light Infantry. In March 1945, the DEOR/RLI amalgamated with the Transvaal Scottish, to form the "DSR" battalion for service in Italy. However, operations in Italy ended before the battalion was ready for deployment. It was used for peacekeeping and security duties in Italy until the end of 1945.

=== Post-war ===
When South Africa became a republic on 31 May 1961, the Duke of Edinburgh's Own Rifles were renamed the "Cape Town Rifles". The official title was changed again, in October 1966, to "Cape Town Rifles (Dukes)". The Regiment was granted the Freedom of the City of Cape Town on 10 October 1967. National service, i.e. conscription of all medically fit White men, was introduced in 1968.

=== Border War ===
The Dukes were converted into a counter-insurgency (COIN) unit in 1974, and served several tours of duty in the Border War, i.e. South African operations against the People's Liberation Army of Namibia. The whole battalion served in Owambo in 1977, and a small contingent served there again in December 1978. Companies served in East Caprivi in 1979, in Kavango in 1980, and in Owambo in 1981 and 1983.

=== State of Emergency ===
The Dukes were deployed on internal security duties in various part of South Africa in 1985, 1986, 1988, and 1990, during the 1985-1990 State of Emergency, which was the government's response to the armed liberation struggle by the African National Congress and others.

== Present ==
Since 1994, the Regiment has been a volunteer unit, and it celebrated its 150th anniversary in 2005 and continues to serve both on external and internal deployments.

=== Name change ===
In August 2019, 52 Reserve Force units had their names changed to reflect the diverse military history of South Africa. The Cape Town Rifles became the Chief Langalibalele Rifles, and have 3 years to design and implement new regimental insignia.

== Regimental Symbols ==
- The regimental badge, worn since 1964, is an eight-pointed star, with a battlemented turret covering the top point. An anchor is superimposed on the turret. In the centre of the star is a stringed bugle horn, surrounded by a buckled strap inscribed "Semper Eadem".
- The previous badge, dating from the 1880s, was the star of the Order of the Thistle, with a royal duke's coronet covering the top point, and the regiment's title around the thistle in the centre of the star.
- The regimental helmet flash is pale gold with a pointed top, and a cherry red chevron across the centre. A hackle (plume) of cherry and gold feathers is worn behind it. The beret flash, worn behind the badge, is a diamond-shape divided horizontally into pale gold over cherry red.
- The Cape Town Rifles are the oldest regiment of Cape Town's five traditional volunteer regiments: the Cape Field Artillery, the Cape Town Rifles (Dukes), the Cape Town Highlanders, the Cape Garrison Artillery and Regiment Westelike Provinsie.

=== Previous Dress Insignia ===
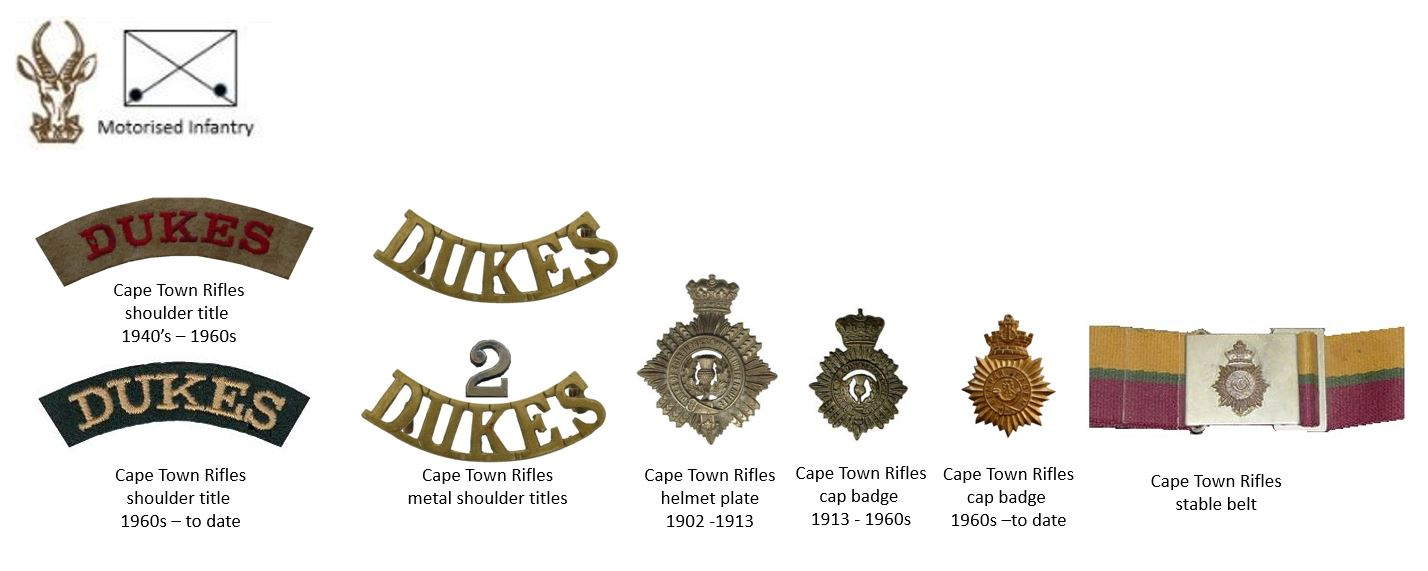
SADF era Cape Town Rifles insignia

== Alliances ==
- United Kingdom – The Rifles

== Battle honours ==
Battle Honours
Awarded to Cape Town Rifles
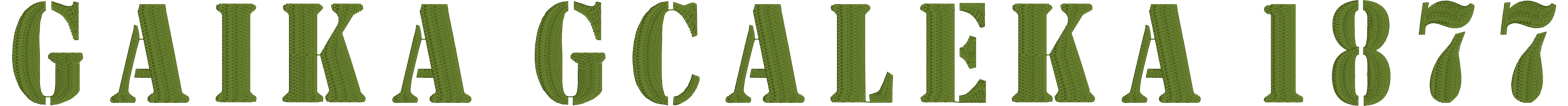
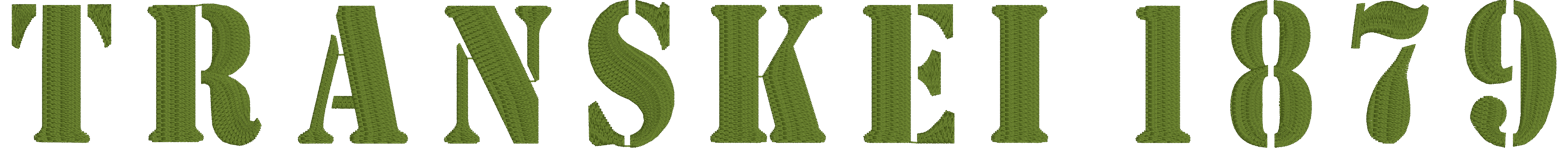
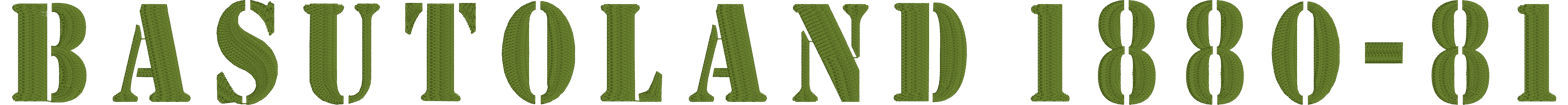
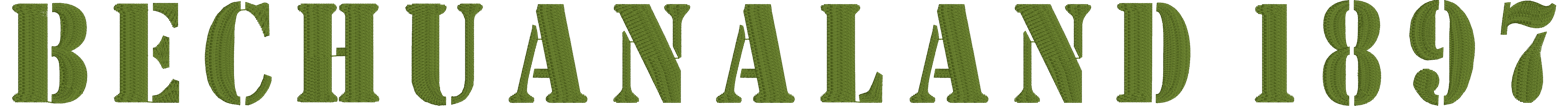
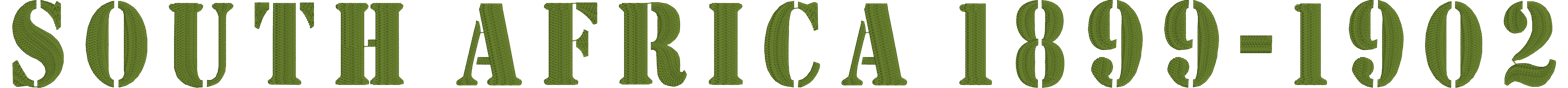
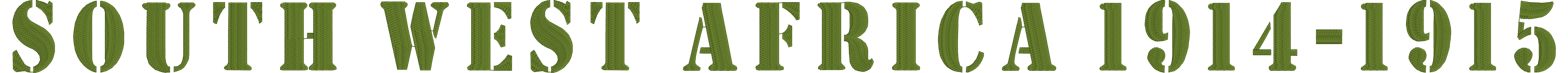
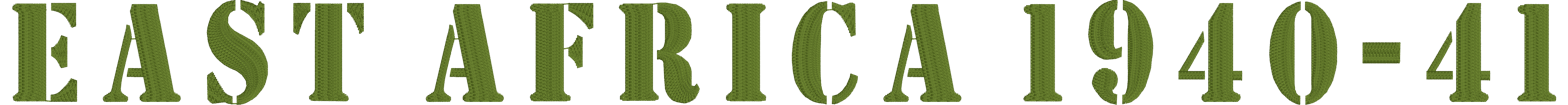
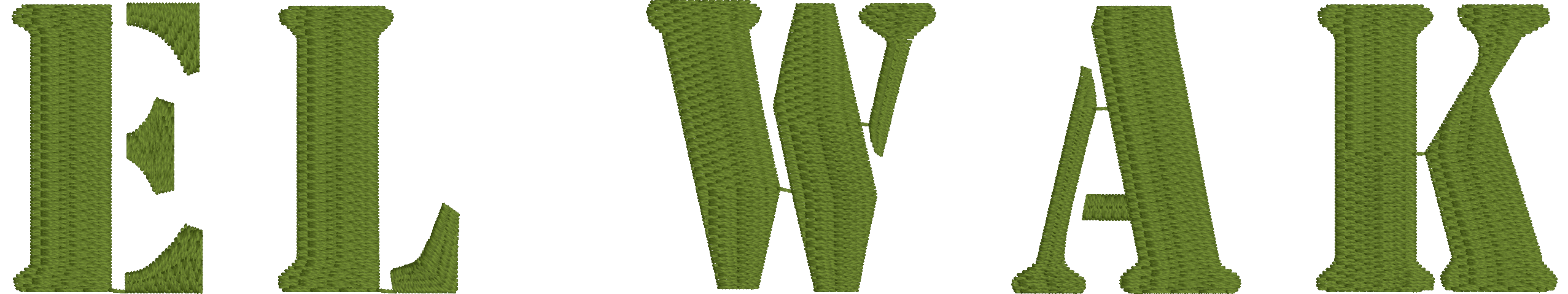
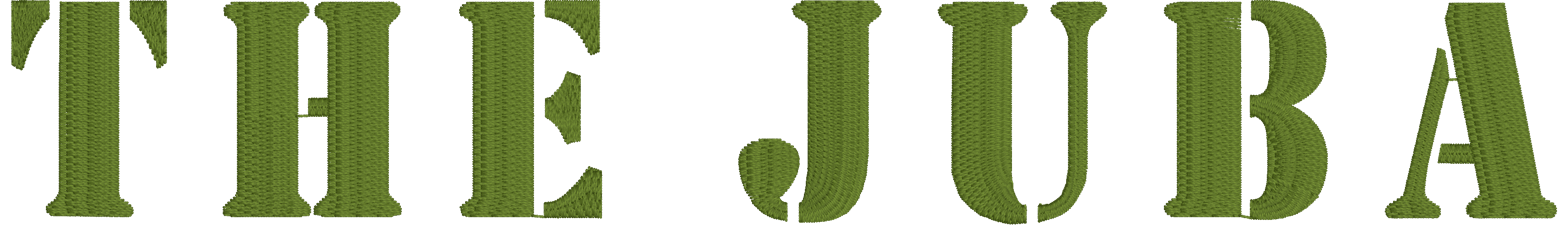
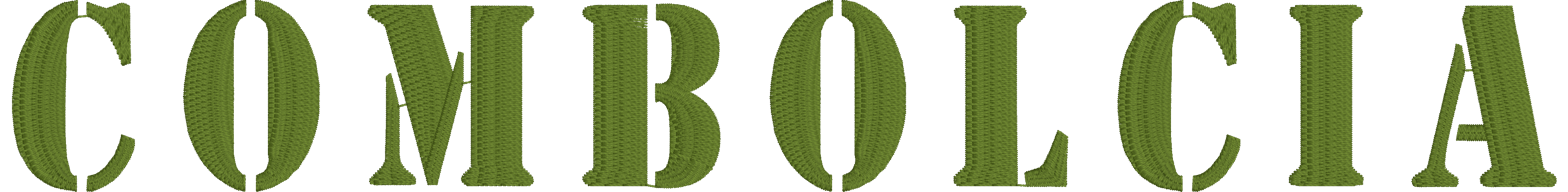
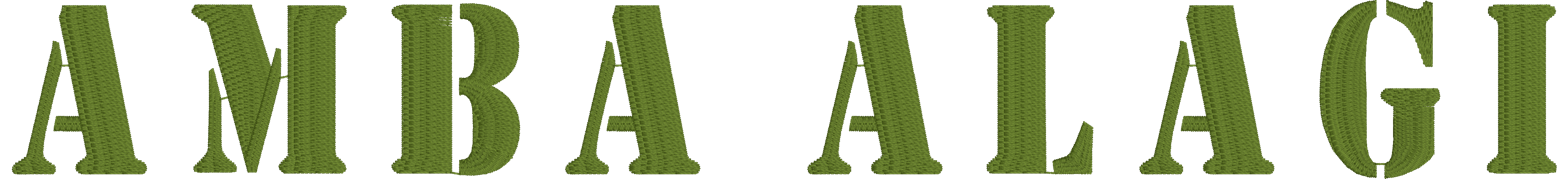
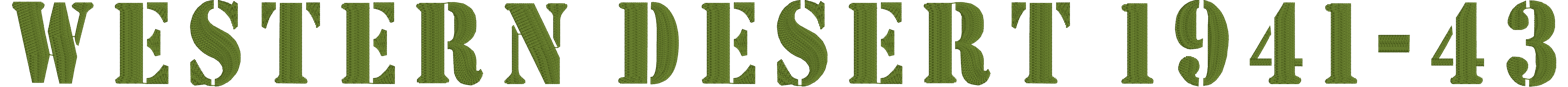
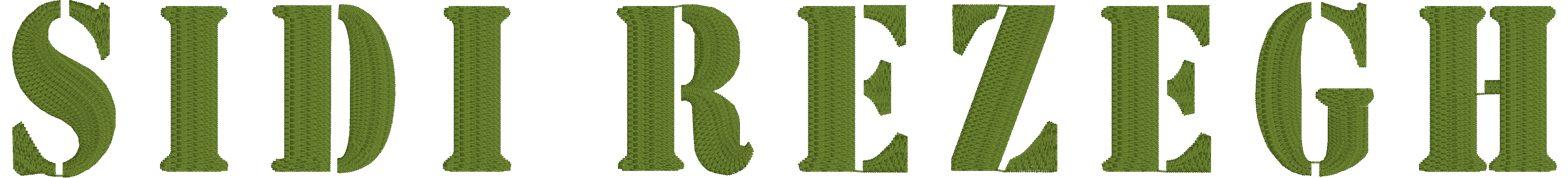
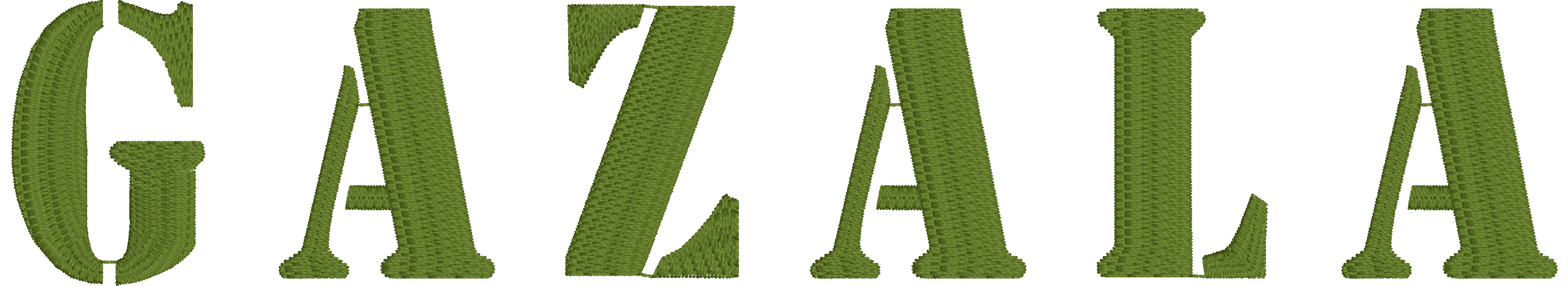
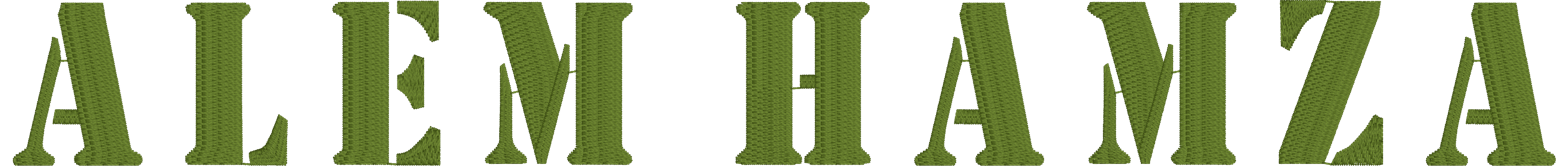
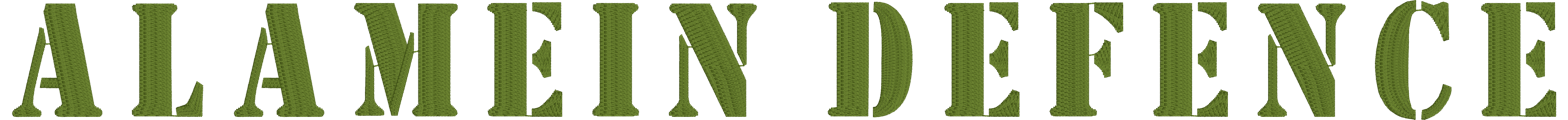
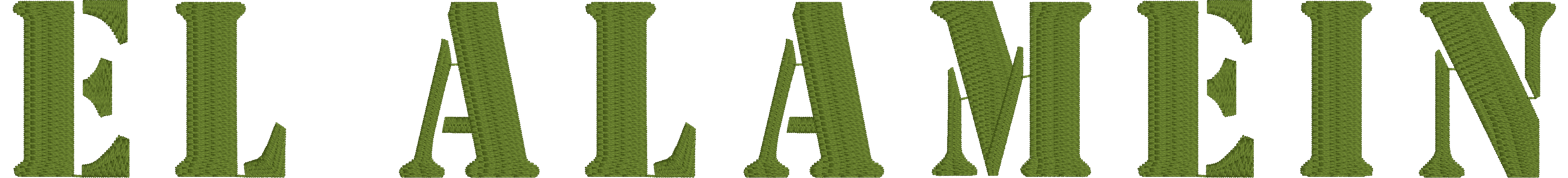

Gaika-Gcaleka 1877, Transkei 1879, Basutoland 1880 – 1881, Bechuanaland 1897, South Africa 1899 – 1902, South-West Africa 1914 – 1915, East Africa 1940 – 1941, El Wak, The Juba, Combolcia, Amba Alagi, Western Desert 1941 – 1943, Sidi Rezegh, Gazala, Alem Hamza, Alamein Defence, El Alamein

== Leadership ==
Leadership
From	Colonel-In-Chief	To	Ribbon
1930	Major General the Earl of Athlone KG,GCB,GCMG,GCVO,DSO,KStJ (Note: Later Governor General of Canada)	1957	Order of the Garter KG Order of the Bath GCB Order of St Michael and St George GCMG Royal Victorian Order GCVO Distinguished Service Order DSO Venerable Order of Saint John KStJ
From	Honorary Colonel	To	Ribbon
1935	Col Cecil James Sibbett JP	1967	
1968	Col Neil Herman Hare ED	1989	Efficiency Decoration (South Africa) ED
1991	Col Helm Roos	1992	
1993	Col Patrick Joseph O'Sullivan	2006	
2007	Col Les Masterson	Present	
From	Commanding Officer	To	Ribbon
1855	Col the Hon. William Hope	1858	
1858	Col John Thomas Eustace CB	1858	Order of the Bath CB
1862	Capt Rice Daniel Jones	1872	
1872	Capt Francis Rennie	1874	
1874	Capt William Keal	1877	
1877	Maj Francis Gimber Goodliffe	1878	
1878	Col Zachary Stanley Bayly	1879	
1879	Maj Francis Gimber Goodliffe	1880	
1880	Col Archibald Graham Wavell	1881	
1881	Maj Francis Gimber Goodliffe	1882	
1882	Maj Henry Hamilton Jones	1884	
1884	Col Richard George Southey	1890	
1890	Lt Col William Alfred Spence VD	1900	Colonial Auxiliary Forces Officers' Decoration VD
1900	Brevet Col. John Lewis	1900	
1900	Col Henry Woodhead, CMH VD	1914	Colonial Auxiliary Forces Officers' Decoration VD
1914	Lt Col William Frederick Gregory VD	1921	Colonial Auxiliary Forces Officers' Decoration VD
1921	Lt Col George Rose DSO,VD	1925	Distinguished Service Order DSO Colonial Auxiliary Forces Officers' Decoration VD
1925	Lt Col Charles Ernst Samuel Bull MC	1929	Military Cross MC
1929	Lt Col Bertram Maynard Woodhead DSO,VD	1933	Distinguished Service Order DSO Colonial Auxiliary Forces Officers' Decoration VD
1933	Lt Col James Edward Harker VD	1933	Colonial Auxiliary Forces Officers' Decoration VD
1934	Lt Col John Hewitt VD	1935	Colonial Auxiliary Forces Officers' Decoration VD
1935	Lt Col Colin Graham Botha VD	1937	Colonial Auxiliary Forces Officers' Decoration VD
1937	Lt Col John Hewitt VD	1938	Colonial Auxiliary Forces Officers' Decoration VD
1938	Lt Col George Thomas Senescall DSO	1941	Distinguished Service Order DSO
1941	Lt Col Harold Lewis Silberbauer MC	1941	Military Cross MC
1941	Lt Col George Thomas Senescall DSO	1942	Distinguished Service Order DSO
1942	Lt Col Johannes Mattheus De Beer	1942	
1942	Maj Leslie Lees	1942	
1942	Maj Alexander Georgeu	1942	
1942	Lt Col Sydney Burdett Gwillam MC	1943	Military Cross MC
1943	Lt Col Pieter Gerhard Vincent dan der Byl MC	1944	Military Cross MC
1944	Maj Neil Herman Hare ED	1945	Efficiency Decoration (South Africa) ED
1945	Lt Col William Hedding DSR	1945	
1945	Cmdt Alexander Douglas Foxwell Sales MC	1953	Military Cross MC
1954	Cmdt Colin Ray Titteron JCD	1955	John Chard Decoration JCD
1956	Cmdt Donald Ivan Moodie SM,JCD	1961	Southern Cross Medal SM John Chard Decoration JCD
1961	Cmdt Albert Joseph Bick JCD	1970	John Chard Decoration JCD
1971	Cmdt Brian Donald Davison JCD	1973	John Chard Decoration JCD
1973	Cmdt Albert Joseph Bick JCD	1974	John Chard Decoration JCD
1975	Cmdt Leslie Clifford Masterson MMM,JCD	1981	Military Merit Medal MMM John Chard Decoration JCD
1982	Cmdt Manfred Albert Krecklenberg MMM,JCD	1988	Military Merit Medal MMM John Chard Decoration JCD
1988	Lt Col James Charles Anthony Gerstner	2001	
2001	Lt Col Ray Nesset MMM,JCD	9 Feb 2014	Military Merit Medal MMM John Chard Decoration JCD
9 Feb 2014	Lt Col Francois Marais , B Mil MMM	June 2018	Military Merit Medal MMM
From	Regimental Sergeants Major	To	Ribbon
1878	RSM James Fergus McQuade	1902	
1903	RSM John Edgar Pearson	1913	
1913	RSM R. Bell	1915	
1926	RSM J.A. Hallas	1926	
1927	RSM C.J. Hunter	1929	
1929	RSM W. Britton	1933	
1933	RSM Lionel Higginbotham	1939	
1939	RSM Douglas Saville Hoyle	1940	
1940	RSM Christopher William Noel Gautier MC	1941	Military Cross MC
1941	RSM Charles Wilfred Gudgeon MC	1943	Military Cross MC
1943	RSM Louis Harry Nuns	1944	
1944	RSM Dene Weitz Melvill DSR	1945	
1946	RSM Ronald Andrews	1947	
1947	RSM Colin Drummond Smith JCD	1964	John Chard Decoration JCD
1965	RSM Johannes Ignatius Jakobus du Toit MMM,JCD	1969	Military Merit Medal MMM John Chard Decoration JCD
1970	RSM Roy Maxwell Kirsten PMM,MMM,JCD	1987	Pro Merito Medal PMM Military Merit Medal MMM John Chard Decoration JCD
1987	RSM Colin Jon Faure	1996	
1996	RSM Kevin Wayne Bey-Leveld	2000	
2000	RSM John Henry Tuck	2005	
2005	RSM Pedro Miguel Dias Lobo	Present	

== Bibliography ==
- McKenzie, A.G. (1957). The Dukes. Regimental Trust.
- Orpen, Neil (1985). The Dukes 1855-1984. Regimental Trust.
- Anon (1989). Cape Town Rifles Dukes (Booklet).
- Dorrington, John (1989). Semper Eadem - The Cape Town Rifles (Dukes). Regimental Trust.
