= Ian Harris (British Army officer) =

British Army general (1910–1999)

Lieutenant-General Sir Ian Harris KBE CB DSO
- Born: Sir Ian Cecil Harris; 7 July 1910; Golden, County Tipperary, Ireland
- Died: 12 March 1999 (aged 88); Dublin, Republic of Ireland
- Military career
- Allegiance: United Kingdom
- Branch: British Army
- Rank: Lieutenant-General
- Service number: 47584
- Commands: 2nd Bn Royal Ulster Rifles; 6th Bn Royal Ulster Rifles; 1st Federal Infantry Brigade in Malaya; Singapore Base District; Northern Ireland
- Conflicts: World War II
- Awards: Knight Commander of the Order of the British Empire; Companion of the Order of the Bath; Distinguished Service Order

Lieutenant-General Sir Ian Cecil "Tommy" Harris KBE CB DSO (7 July 1910 – 12 March 1999) was an Irish British Army General who reached high office in the 1960s.

== Military career ==
Ian Harris was commissioned into the Royal Ulster Rifles in 1930.

He served in World War II initially on the North West Frontier of India but became commanding officer of 2nd Bn Royal Ulster Rifles in 1943.

After the War he became a general staff officer with 25th Indian Division and then 7th Division in Burma and Malaya before moving on to India and Pakistan. He was assistant quartermaster general at Scottish Command from 1949 to 1951 when he became commanding officer of 6th Bn Royal Ulster Rifles. He was appointed chief of staff in Northern Ireland in 1952 and then commander of 1st Federal Infantry Brigade in Malaya in 1954. He was appointed deputy director of staff duties (army) at the War Office in 1957 and general officer commanding Singapore Base District in 1960 before becoming chief of staff for contingencies planning at the Supreme Headquarters Allied Powers Europe in Brussels in 1963.

He was general officer commanding Northern Ireland Command from 1966 until 1969 when he retired.

He was also colonel of the Royal Ulster Rifles from 1962 to 1968 and of the Royal Irish Rangers from 1968 to 1972. He was the first colonel of the latter regiment.

Military offices
Preceded by Desmond Fitzpatrick	General Officer Commanding the British Army in Northern Ireland; 1966−1969	Succeeded by Ian Freeland
