= John Thomas Eustace =

South African politician

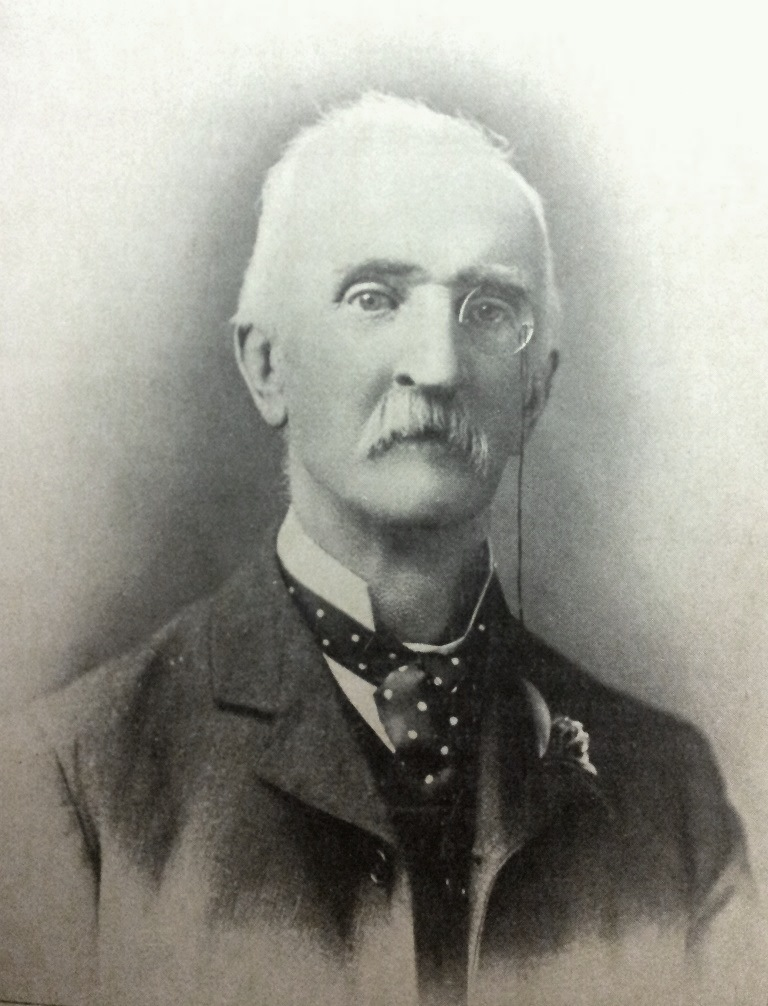
- Lieutenant Colonel Eustace as MP for Cape Town

Member of the Cape of Good Hope Parliament for Cape Town
- In office 1869–1874

Lieutenant Colonel John Thomas Eustace (9 March 1825 – 25 December 1919) was an influential conservative member of the Parliament of the Cape of Good Hope.

== Early life, military and business ==
Born in 1825 at Grosvenor Place, London, he was the eldest son of Lieutenant General Sir William Cornwallis Eustace, CB KCH and his wife Caroline Margaret, daughter of John King, M.P. of Aldenham House, Herts., In spite of his poor health, he joined the army after his studies, as much of his family had. After purchasing a commission in the 60th rifles, he commanded Turkish irregular cavalry in the Crimean War, served in the Middle East, and was appointed Lieutenant Colonel, before emigrating to the Cape Colony. Here, he briefly served as commanding officer of the Cape Town Rifles in 1858, and lieutenant colonel of the Cape Town Volunteers. He was one of the Directors of the Cape Town Railway and Dock Company (an early predecessor of the Cape Government Railways) when it was formed in 1857.

He served as Vice President of the Chamber of Commerce, married Edith Kate Twentyman in 1860, settled in Wynberg, Cape Town, and had thirteen children. Like the rest of his family, his male children mostly pursued careers in the military. His eldest daughter Emily Laura Alicia Eustace (1870-1941) married Henry George de Graeff van Polsbroek (1858-1941), styled Baron van Polsbroek.

== Parliament (1869-74) ==
He served as one of the four members representing Cape Town in the Cape Parliament. Although Cape Town was a predominantly liberal constituency, Eustace himself was a strong conservative. As such he supported stronger links with the British Empire, a greater roll-out of missionary work in Africa, and a military approach to the Cape Colony's frontier relations.

In this capacity he was prominent in fighting the rising movement for "responsible government" (local democracy and therefore greater independence from Britain). This dispute reached its height in the 1869 with the suspension of the Cape constitution and Governor Wodehouse's attempt to assume a more direct rule of the colony. This suspension move put the "responsibles" on the defensive, and Eustace emerged as one of the leaders of the Conservatives in Parliament - at the height of his influence and power.

In the resulting election of November 1869, which the conservatives had hoped to win, Eustace was returned for Cape Town, but as last of that constituency's four seats, with the two liberals leading (In order, William Porter, Saul Solomon, Philip John Stigant, John Thomas Eustace). Though Eustace had the support of many of the conservatives which he led in Parliament, the overwhelming majority in the Cape Colony opposed Wodehouse's move for more direct control and, at the end of the struggle, the Governor returned to London defeated. The Cape was then able to elect its first executive government and prime minister in 1872.

Another movement, allied to that of responsible government, was the Voluntaryism movement led by Saul Solomon, which argued for a complete separation between Church and State. As a proponent of stronger links between Church and State, Eustace also fought this movement but also, ultimately, unsuccessfully.

== Diplomatic agent ==
Eustace lost most of his family fortune in a financial disaster, and in 1876 he entered the civil service. For most of his later life, he served as magistrate or resident for several neighbouring territories surrounding the Cape Colony, serving effectively as a minor ambassador.

=== Gcaleka Xhosa agent (1876-79) ===
In November 1876 he assumed the duty of resident for the Gcaleka tribe of the Xhosa nation. At the time, a drought and famine was commencing, and conflict broke out between the Fengu people (Cape citizens) and the neighbouring Gcaleka people.

The Colonel withdrew with his staff to Ibeka, as the conflict escalated. Initially, the Gcaleka made it clear that they were only at war with the Fengu; however, as the Fengu were Cape citizens, escalation followed as the Cape Government was drawn in. On 26 September a Gcaleka force of several thousand crossed the border and attacked a Cape Colony police station which was manned predominantly by police of Fengu origin. The 9th Frontier War commenced. In the aftermath of the war, he briefly moved back to the region to work on resettling several of the affected tribes and drawing boundaries.

=== Great Namaqualand ===
From 1879, he served as magistrate at Springbokfontein, and a civil commissioner for the Great Namaqualand (modern Namibia), where he informed the Cape Government of the early movements of the future German colonizers. The Cape had a political institution, the Palgrave Commission charged with investigating a possible union between the Namaqualand and the Cape Colony. He was a strong proponent of British annexation of the Namaqualand. In December 1883, John X. Merriman MLA sent him on a secret mission to gather information on the German settlements.

== Later life ==
For the last part of his life he served as the civil commissioner for Mossel Bay. He also published several of his writings in Cape Town. He authored a paper claiming the Baltinglass Viscountcy of Ireland for his family. He also wrote on "native relations".

He died in 1919. His orbituary described him as: "strict in principle, courteous in demeanour and humble before God."
