= Cape Town Irish Volunteer Rifles =

South African volunteer military unit

The Cape Town Irish Volunteer Rifles was a volunteer part-time military unit, which existed for a few years in late Victorian South Africa. It formed in Cape Town in 1885, in response to fears of a war between the United Kingdom and Russia (the Cape Town Highlanders formed at the same time for the same reason). Thomas O'Reilly, an Irish-born Cape politician, commanded it. Never a large unit, its greatest strength, in 1888, was only 214 (all ranks). In 1891 it was absorbed by the Duke of Edinburgh's Own Volunteer Rifles.
