= Killaloe March =

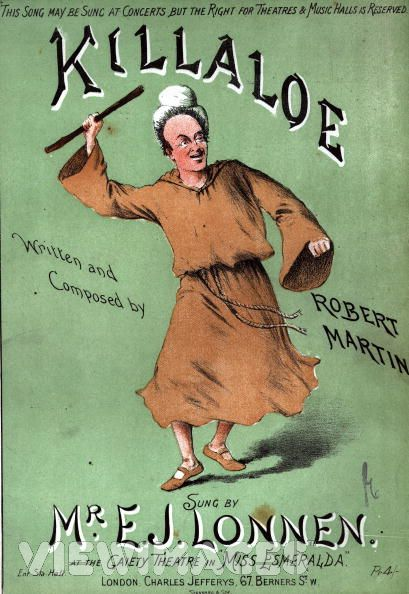
"Killaloe" was also the signature tune of E. J. Lonnen

Killaloe is the Regimental Quick March of the British Army regiment, The Royal Irish Regiment (27th (Inniskilling) 83rd and 87th and Ulster Defence Regiment). It has informal, historical associations with other Irish Regiments and Brigades: as an unofficial march by the Connaught Rangers and Royal Inniskilling Fusiliers and at brigade level in World War II by the 38th (Irish) Infantry Brigade. Further to this it has also been adopted by the PSNI Pipe Band at passing out parades for new recruits. It is also the regimental march of the South African Irish Regiment.

== History ==
"Killaloe" is a popular march in the Irish Regiments of the British Army, written in 1887 by a 41-year-old Irish composer named Robert "Ballyhooly Bob" Martin of Ross, for the Strand located Gaiety Theatre musical production "Miss Esmeralda", a burlesque production based on "The Hunchback of Notre Dame". Mr E. J. Lonnen, playing Frollo the monk, sang the song to great acclaim.

Robert Martin was the elder brother of Violet Martin, more famous as "Martin Ross" of the literary cousins "Somerville & Ross", who wrote "Remniscences of an Irish R.M." and other stories. Bob Martin gained his nickname from his even more famous hit of the time "Ballyhooly March". As a Galway estate landowner he was related through his bohemian cousin Willie Wills, the famous Victorian court artist and composer, to General John Doyle, who founded the 87th, later the Royal Irish Fusiliers. Martin was so impoverished by the Land League rent strikes that he moved to London and turned to journalism, burlesque song writing and politics. He worked for the Sporting Chronicle, nicknamed "The Pink'un", on account of the colour of the paper, a Victorian version of "Private Eye" crossed with "News of the World".

He was also a member of the Pelican Club, a notorious group of aristocracy, gentry, sportsmen, army officers, sporting journalists and other colourful characters who believed in living life to the full, usually well beyond their means, and who held court at Romano's restaurant in the Strand, near the Gaiety Theatre. A significant number of the aristocracy scandalised Victorian society by marrying "Gaiety Girls" who provided the glamour in the burlesque productions, hence the nickname "The actressocracy" for these socially climbing girls. PG Wodehouse took many of the exploits of this Victorian social group, he was a young reporter at the time, and subsequently reset them very successfully in the 1920s and 30s, around the exploits of Bertie Wooster and his butler Jeeves. The character of Galahad Threepwood, brother to the Earl of Emsworth, is an actual member of the Pelicans (cf. "A Pelican at Blandings").

Martin was politically active as a boycotted landowner, staunch unionist, political activist, an "Emergency man" and a close associate of Arthur Balfour, first Secretary for Ireland and later Prime Minister. His virulent Anti Home Rule views are reflected in his songs, which consistently depict the Irish as drunken, brawling if loveable rogues who were clearly unfit to govern themselves. Martin wrote about thirty songs for various burlesque productions, including "Murphy of the Irish Fusiliers", although a copy of this has yet to surface.

== Lyrics ==
=== Original Lyrics ===
Well I Happened to be born

At the time they cut the corn
Quite contagious to the town of Killaloe
Where to tayche us they'd a schame
And a French Mossoo he came
to instruct us in the game of parley voo.

I've one father that I swear
But he said I had a pair
And he struck me when I said it wasn't true
And the Irish for 'a jint'
Or the french for 'half a pint'
Faith we learnt it in the school at Killaloe.

CHORUS
You may talk of Boneyparty
You may talk about Ecarté
Or any other party and "Commong de portey voo"
We larnt to sing it aisey
That song the Marshalaysy
Boolong toolong the continong
We larnt at killaloe

"May we" Mosso would cry,
"Well of course you can" sez I
"Non-no"-"I know" says I with some surprise
When a boy straight up from Clare, heard his mother called a "mare"
He gave Mosso his fisht between the eyes
Says Mosso with much alarm "Go and call for Johnny Darm"
"There's no such name" says I " about the place"
"Common'?" he made reply "Come on yerself!" sez I
And I scattered all the features of his face

CHORUS

Oh boys, where was the fun, you should see him when 'twas done
His eyeballs one by one did disappear
And a doctor from the South took one look at his mouth
Which had some how got concayled behind his ear
Then he swore an awful oath, he'd have the law agin' us both
And then he'd have both Lim-e-rick and Clare
For he found it wouldn't do, to teach French in Killaloe
Unless he has a face or two to spare

CHORUS

To the magistrate he went, and a lot of time he shpent
Says the magistrate "Begorra I'm perplexed"
For a fellow who you see, spells whiskey O-D-V, (Eau de vie)
You never know what he'll be up to next
Then nothin' more was said, Mosso went home to bed
And mixed no more in Killaloe affairs
For the foreign taychers face
Was no more about the place
But was closed for alterations and repairs

CHORUS

If disgraces you would try, or would prove an alibi
Or alter your appearance just for fun
You've just one thing to do, go teach French at Killaloe
And you mother will not know you for her son
French may be very fine, its no enemy of mine
But as I think you'll eas-i-ly suppose
Whatever tongue you take, it is mighty hard to shpake
While your ear keeps changing places with your nose

CHORUS

Now I'm glad to find 'tis true, you are pleased with Killaloe
And our conduct to the teacher they did send
But I've told you all that passed, so this verse must be the last
Thats the rason I have left it to the end
We're all Irish tenants there, and we're all prepared to swear
That to the Irish language we'll be true.
But we all with one consent, when they ask us for the rent
Sure we answer then in French in Killaloe.

CHORUS

You may talk of Bonyparty.....

=== Connaught Ranger Lyrics ===
The Devil's Own had lyrics of their own, composed in c.1890 by Lieutenant Charles Martin:

In our army we're the best

From the north, south, east or west
The best of boys are following the drum.
We are mighty hard to bate,
I may say without concete,
Faith the enemy are welcome when they come.
Be they Russian, French or Dutch
It doesn't matter much,
We're the boys to give 'em sugar in their tay
For we're the Connaught Rangers,
The lads to face all dangers,
Faugh-a-ballagh, faugh-a-aballagh, Clear the way!

Chorus:

You may talk about your guards boys
Your lancers and hussars boys
Your fusiliers and royal artillery (without the guns)
The girls we drive'em crazy, the foe we beat them easy
The rangers from old Connaught, yaarrr, the land across the sea!

Now allow me here to state,
It is counted quite a trate,
In old Ireland just for fight for friends's sake
To crack your neighbor's head,
Or maybe your own instead.
Faith 'tis just the fun and glory of a wake
So you see all Irish boys are accustomed to such noise
It's as natural as drinking whiskey neat.
For there's none among them all, from Kingston to Donegal, Like the gallant Connaught Ranger on his beat.

Chorus

T'was Bonaparte who said as the Frenchmen on he led
Marshall Soult, be them the Rangers do you know?
Faith says Soult, there's no mistake, to our heels we'd better take
I think it's time for you and I to go.
When the colleens hear their step, it makes their hearts to leap
Aaargh, jewels will ye wist till Parrick's day?
For they are the Connaught Rangers, the boys that fear no dangers
And they're the lads that always take the sway.

Chorus

Now you haven't far to search, for the lads who best can march
The lads that never fear the longest day,
Faith you easily will know, their dashing step will show
Tis the Connaught boys who always lead the way.
If me words perhaps you doubt, come and join 'em on a route
I'm thinkin' you'll not find it quite a treat;
You'll see them in the van, you may catch them if you can

Faith you'll have to travel fast or you'll be late.

=== Royal Irish Ranger lyrics ===
The soldiers of the Royal Irish Rangers had their own words to the tune which would be sung, sotto voce, as they marched. They may be based on the Connaught Ranger version:

We're the Irish Rangers,

The boys who fear no danger,
We're the boys from paddy's land
YO!

Shut up you bastards and fight
