= De Wet Decoration =

- Type: Military long service decoration
- Awarded for: 20 years loyal service and good conduct
- Country: South Africa
- Presented by: the State President and, from 1994, the President
- Eligibility: Members of the Commandos * Officers only from 1965 to 1986 * All ranks after 1986
- Post-nominals: DWD
- Clasps: 30 years service
- Status: Discontinued in 2003
- Established: 1965
- Ribbon bars for 20 and 30 years of service

SADF pre-1994 & SANDF post-2002 orders of wear
- Next (higher): SADF precedence: John Chard Decoration; SANDF precedence: John Chard Decoration
- Next (lower): SADF succession: Cadet Corps Medal; SANDF succession: Cadet Corps Medal

The De Wet Decoration, post-nominal letters DWD, is a military long service decoration which was instituted by the Republic of South Africa in 1965. It could be awarded to members of the Commandos, the rural civil defence component of the South African Defence Force, for twenty years of efficient service and good conduct. The decoration was initially reserved for officers, but it was made available to all ranks in 1986. A clasp could be awarded after thirty years service.

== The South African military ==
The Union Defence Forces (UDF) were established in 1912 and renamed the South African Defence Force (SADF) in 1958. On 27 April 1994, it was integrated with six other independent forces into the South African National Defence Force (SANDF).

== Institution ==
The De Wet Decoration, post-nominal letters DWD, was instituted by the State President, C.R. Swart in 1965. It was named after Second Boer War General Christiaan de Wet. The De Wet Decoration was one of only three South African military awards for long service which entitled the recipient to the use of post-nominal letters, the others being the John Chard Decoration (JCD), which was awarded to Citizen Force members, and the defunct Efficiency Decoration (ED).

== Award criteria ==
The decoration could be awarded to officers of the Commandos, the rural civil defence component of the South African Defence Force, for twenty years of efficient service and good conduct. Award of the decoration was made available to all ranks in 1986.

A clasp could be awarded to holders of the De Wet Decoration after 30 years service. When medals are not worn, recipients of the clasp wear a button with the encircled letters "DWD" on the ribbon bar.

== Order of wear ==
The position of the De Wet Decoration in the official order of precedence was revised three times to accommodate the institution or addition of new decorations and medals, first upon the integration into the South African National Defence Force on 27 April 1994, again when decorations and medals were belatedly instituted in April 1996 for the two former non-statutory forces, the Azanian People's Liberation Army and Umkhonto we Sizwe, and again when a new series of military decorations and medals was instituted in South Africa on 27 April 2003, but it remained unchanged on all three occasions.

Official SANDF order of precedence

- Preceded by the John Chard Decoration (JCD) of the Republic of South Africa.
- Succeeded by the Cadet Corps Medal of the Republic of South Africa.

Official national order of precedence

- Preceded by the John Chard Decoration (JCD) of the Republic of South Africa.
- Succeeded by the Cadet Corps Medal of the Republic of South Africa.

== Description ==
Obverse

The De Wet Decoration is a medallion, struck in silver, 38 millimetres in diameter and 3 millimetres thick, depicting Second Boer War General Christiaan de Wet on horseback, surrounded by a wreath of proteas and inscribed "DEKORASIE ~ DE WET ~ DECORATION".

Reverse

The reverse has the pre-1994 South African Coat of Arms, with the decoration number impressed or engraved below.

Ribbon

The ribbon is 32 millimetres wide, with a 3 millimetres wide green band, a 2 millimetres wide white band and an 8 millimetres wide yellow band, repeated in reverse order and separated by a 6 millimetres wide dark blue band in the centre. The green and yellow colours have their origin in the ribbon colours of the three awards which were belatedly instituted in 1920, as retrospective awards for Boer veteran officers and men of the Second Boer War of 1899–1902, the Dekoratie voor Trouwe Dienst, the Medalje voor de Anglo-Boere Oorlog and the Lint voor Verwonding. For these three awards, these two colours had been gazetted as green and orange, but the orange appeared as yellow on the actual ribbons.

Clasp

The clasp is in silver, with the encircled letters "DWD" embossed in the centre. Two versions of the clasp exist, the original with the tops and bottoms of the characters "DWD" following the circumference of the circle, and a second version with the bottoms of the characters in line. Members who had been awarded the clasp wear a silver button, 8 millimetres in diameter and inscribed "DWD", on the ribbon bar when medals are not worn.

== Discontinuation ==
Conferment of the De Wet Decoration was discontinued in respect of services performed on or after 27 April 2003.
