= John Chard Decoration =

- John Chard Decoration with ribbon insignia for Army service
- Type: Military long service decoration
- Awarded for: 20 years service
- Country: South Africa
- Presented by: the Monarch of the United Kingdom and the Commonwealth realms, from 1961 by the State President and from 1994 by the President
- Eligibility: Members of the Citizen Force
- Post-nominals: JCD
- Status: Discontinued in 2003
- Established: 1952
- First award: 1955
- Final award: 4 December 2008
- Ribbon bar

SADF pre-1994 & SANDF post-2002 orders of wear
- Next (higher): SADF precedence: Good Service Medal, Gold; SANDF precedence: Medalje vir Troue Diens and Bar, 30 years
- Next (lower): SADF succession: De Wet Decoration; SANDF succession: De Wet Decoration

The John Chard Decoration, post-nominal letters JCD, was a military long service decoration which was instituted by the Union of South Africa on 6 April 1952. It was awarded to members of the Citizen Force of the South African Defence Force for twenty years of efficient service and good conduct. Clasps could be awarded after thirty and forty years service respectively.

== The South African military ==
The Union Defence Forces (UDF) were established in 1912 and renamed the South African Defence Force (SADF) in 1958. On 27 April 1994, it was integrated with six other independent forces into the South African National Defence Force (SANDF).

== Institution ==
The John Chard Decoration, post-nominal letters JCD, was instituted by Queen Elizabeth II on 6 April 1952, during the Tercentenary Van Riebeeck Festival.

== Award criteria ==
The decoration was awarded to all ranks of the Citizen Force for twenty years efficient service, not necessarily continuous. It was initially one of only three awards for long service which entitled the recipient to the use of post-nominal letters, the others being the De Wet Decoration (DWD), which was awarded to Commando members, and the defunct Efficiency Decoration (ED).

In respect of officers, the John Chard Decoration replaced the Efficiency Decoration, which had been awarded to officers of the Citizen Force between 1939 and 1952. The decoration was named after John Chard VC, the lieutenant in command of the supply depot at Rorke's Drift during the Anglo-Zulu War, when it was attacked by Zulus in January 1879. Upon being awarded the John Chard Decoration, recipients of the John Chard Medal were no longer allowed to wear the medal.

A clasp could be awarded to holders of the John Chard Decoration after 30 years service. In 1977, a second clasp was instituted for award after 40 years service.

From 1 July 1975, when the Good Service Medal, Silver was instituted as the middle award in a new series of three medals for long service for members of all three elements of the South African Defence Force, qualifying Citizen Force members who had already been awarded the John Chard Medal, but who had not yet been awarded the John Chard Decoration, could elect to receive the Good Service Medal, Silver instead, but such members would thereafter be restricted to the series chosen.

The choice was therefore between, on the one hand, a further two medals which would, together with the John Chard Medal, eventually reward thirty years service and of which all three medals could be worn together, once awarded and, on the other hand, the existing Citizen Force series of a medal, a decoration which entitled the recipient to the post-nominal letters JCD and, after thirty and forty years respectively, clasps to the decoration, of which only the decoration (and clasps) could be worn once awarded.

To resolve the issue, recipients of the John Chard Decoration and John Chard Medal were allowed, from 1986, to wear both the decoration and the medal. Members who elected to receive the John Chard series would, however, still be excluded from receiving the Good Service Medal, Gold after completing thirty years of qualifying service.

== Order of wear ==
With effect from 6 April 1952, when the John Chard Decoration and several other new decorations and medals were instituted, these new awards took precedence before all earlier British orders, decorations and medals awarded to South Africans, with the exception of the Victoria Cross, which still took precedence before all other awards. The other older British awards continued to be worn in the order prescribed by the British Central Chancery of the Orders of Knighthood.

The position of the John Chard Decoration in the official order of precedence was revised three times after 1975, to accommodate the inclusion or institution of new decorations and medals, first upon the integration into the South African National Defence Force on 27 April 1994, again in April 1996 when decorations and medals were belatedly instituted for the two former non-statutory forces, the Azanian People's Liberation Army and Umkhonto we Sizwe, and finally upon the institution of a new set of awards on 27 April 2003.

South African Defence Force until 26 April 1994

- Official SADF order of precedence:
  - Preceded by the Good Service Medal, Gold.
  - Succeeded by the De Wet Decoration (DWD).
- Official national order of precedence:
  - Preceded by the National Intelligence Service Medal for Faithful Service, 30 Years.
  - Succeeded by the De Wet Decoration (DWD).

South African National Defence Force from 27 April 1994

- Official SANDF order of precedence:
  - Preceded by the Long Service Medal, Gold of the Republic of Venda.
  - Succeeded by the De Wet Decoration (DWD) of the Republic of South Africa.
- Official national order of precedence:
  - Preceded by the Correctional Services Medal for Faithful Service, 30 Years of the KwaZulu Homeland.
  - Succeeded by the De Wet Decoration (DWD) of the Republic of South Africa.

South African National Defence Force from April 1996

- Official SANDF order of precedence:
  - Preceded by the Service Medal in Gold of Umkhonto we Sizwe.
  - Succeeded by the De Wet Decoration (DWD) of the Republic of South Africa.
- Official national order of precedence:
  - Preceded by the Service Medal in Gold of Umkhonto we Sizwe.
  - Succeeded by the De Wet Decoration (DWD) of the Republic of South Africa.

South African National Defence Force from 27 April 2003

- Official SANDF order of precedence:
  - Preceded by the Medalje vir Troue Diens and Bar, 30 years of the Republic of South Africa.
  - Succeeded by the De Wet Decoration (DWD) of the Republic of South Africa.
- Official national order of precedence:
  - Preceded by the Medalje vir Troue Diens and Bar, 30 years of the Republic of South Africa.
  - Succeeded by the De Wet Decoration (DWD) of the Republic of South Africa.

== Description ==
Initially all South African military orders, decorations and medals were minted by the South African Mint, but with effect from c. 1980, the manufacturing of all new awards as well as the further production of older awards were put out to tender by private enterprises. Since the tooling of the older awards was retained by the Mint, private manufacturers had to manufacture their own tooling, which resulted in several variations in appearance. Poor quality control and cost cutting by manufacturers resulted in the acceptance and award of a large number of decorations which were struck in nickel-plated bronze instead of silver, less than 3 millimetres thick, with no raised rim on the reverse, with the ribbon suspender struck as an integral part of the decoration and even with the coat of arms off centre, such as the one depicted.

Thin version without rim on reverse

Obverse

The John Chard Decoration is an oval medallion struck in silver, 39 millimetres wide, 51 millimetres high and 3 millimetres thick. It depicts a tree, the river and the mission station at Rorke's Drift in Natal, the scene of the 1879 battle in which Lieutenant Chard and ten of his men won the Victoria Cross (VC), and is inscribed "RORKE'S DRIFT 1879". The scene is surrounded by the inscriptions "JOHN CHARD" at the top and "DECORATION : DEKORASIE" at the bottom.

Reverse

The reverse has the pre-1994 South African coat of arms and the original decorations, minted by the South African Mint, have a raised rim and a separately struck ribbon suspender which is soldered to the top of the decoration, such as the one depicted at the top of the page. The decoration number was impressed or engraved at the bottom on the rim.

Clasps

The clasps are struck in silver (thirty years) and silver-gilt (forty years) and have a circle containing the letters "JCD" embossed in the centre.

Ribbon

The ribbon is the same as the ribbon for the John Chard Medal, 32 millimetres wide with a 3 millimetres wide dark blue band, a 2 millimetres wide white band, a 22 millimetres wide dark red band, a 2 millimetres wide white band and a 3 millimetres wide dark blue band. Since a silver button inscribed "JCD" is already worn on the ribbon bar, miniature versions of the distinguishing insignia in silver, which are worn on the ribbon, are not worn on the ribbon bar. These distinguishing insignia denote the Arm of the Service in which the qualifying service was rendered, crossed swords for the South African Army, an eagle for the South African Air Force and an anchor for the South African Navy.

== Discontinuation ==
Conferment of the John Chard Decoration was discontinued in respect of services performed on or after 27 April 2003, when it was replaced by the new Medalje vir Troue Diens and Bar, 20 years.
