= 2019 renaming of South African National Defence Force reserve units =

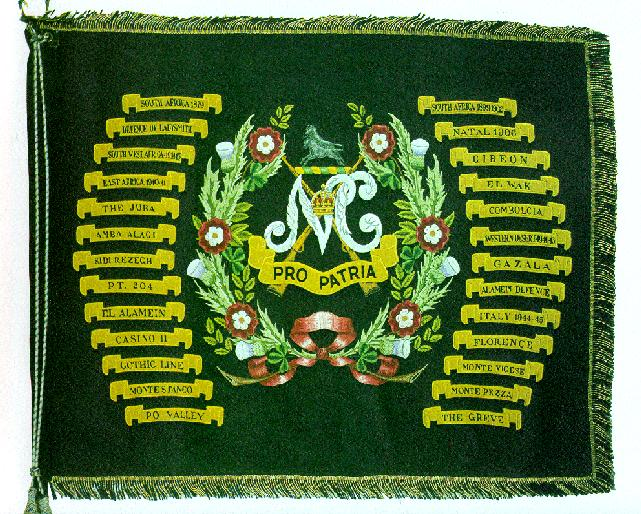
Colour of the Natal Carbineers which will be laid up as part of its renaming to the Ingobamakhosi Carbineers

In 2019 the South African National Defence Force (SANDF) renamed 52 of its 66 army's Reserve Force units. The changes were made to include more indigenous African references in the unit names, which had previously had a colonial and apartheid-era influence. The SANDF's Name Review Steering Committee led the process in consultation with the units, past members and communities. Name suggestions came from the units, with the army's director of reserves, Brigadier General Gerhard Kamffer providing a list of suggestions. Of the renamed units 26 took names relating to indigenous African military history and 25 took names relating to the apartheid and colonial era. Units were initially given three years to transition their insignia to the new names; this was later extended to the end of April 2023.

== Background ==
Many units of the South African National Defence Force's Reserve Force had ancestry dating back to the British colonial era (including units of the Union Defence Force) and the apartheid-era South African Defence Force. The names of these units reflected this heritage including many named in or after 1934 for Boer generals.

A process of assessing the names of the units was begun by then chief of the South African Army Lieutenant General Vusumuzi Masondo in 2013. The intention was to include more indigenous African influence in the unit names. The names of 66 reserve units were reviewed and it was determined that 52 should be changed.

== Renaming ==
The process of renaming was overseen by the Name Review Steering Committee. The process involved three rounds of consultation with serving soldiers, unit commanders, regimental councils (consisting of current and former members), regimental associations of past members, town councils and communities associated with the units. The units were asked to suggest potential new names. They were assisted by a list of names drawn up under the oversight of the director of reserves, Brigadier General Gerhard Kamffer. The list comprised names of South African military personalities, battles and events from across a range of eras, cultures and regions. The list was inspired partly by a 1983 anti-apartheid poster by Thamsanga Mnyele that depicted black South African figures such as Shaka, Sol Plaatje, Moshoeshoe I and Maqoma.

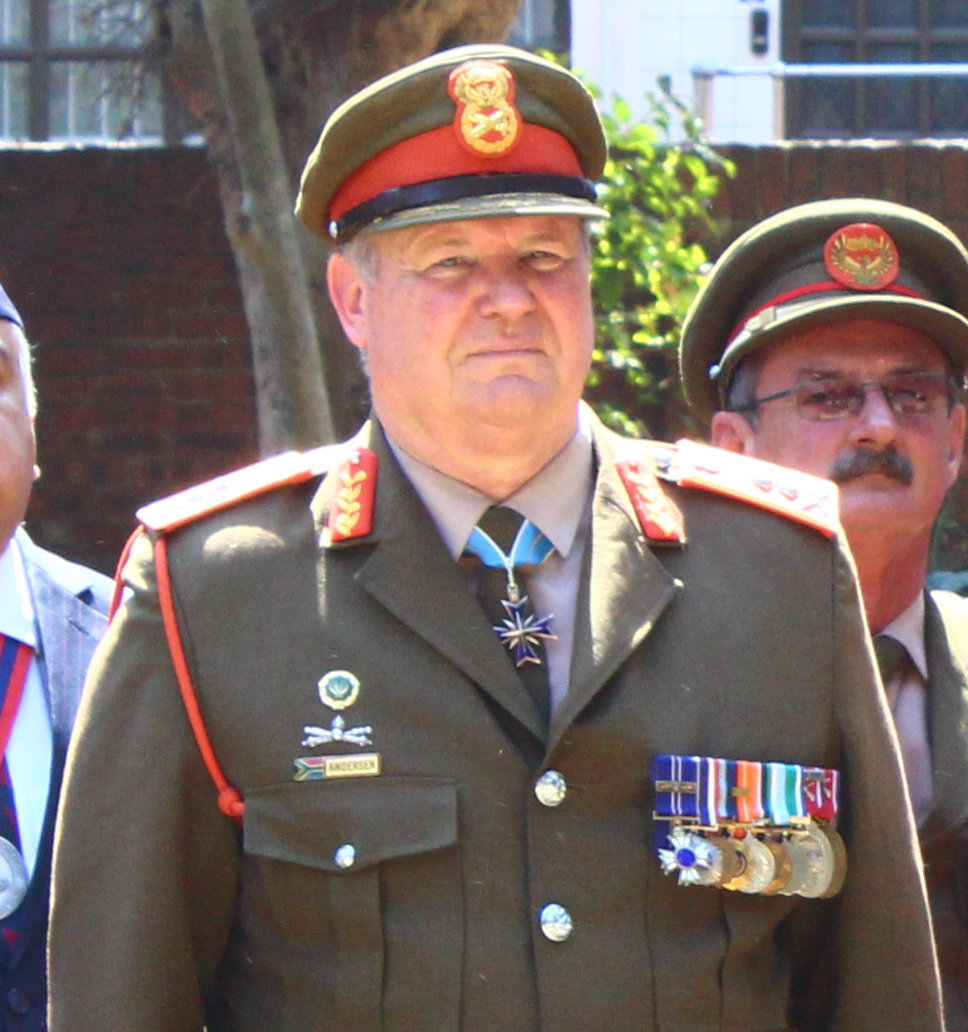
Roy Andersen in 2014

Units were not permitted to be named after living persons. Major General Roy Andersen, Chief Defence Reserves of the SANDF said "the names created are to uphold their heritage and to be attractive to the youth of today". Many geographical locations in South Africa have been renamed since 1994 by the South African Geographical Names Council, often those named after British or Boer military personnel. In many cases where reserve units were named after these locations their name was not updated. The units with geographical names were asked to consider not merely updating their names but to consider a name taken from South African military history.

The names suggested by the units were reviewed by the committee, which was led by Kamffer. Where the committee was not satisfied the unit was asked to suggest another name, though this happened only on two occasions. When the process was completed 25 of the renamed units were named after indigenous African military history, with 15 names linked to the anti-apartheid campaign. Some 26 of the new unit names were associated with so-called "statutory" military history of the apartheid and colonial era. Three units were given names relating to anti-apartheid leader and first black president Nelson Mandela and two were named after Sekhukhune, king and military leader of the Pedi people in the 19th century. The South African army's Natal Carbineers were renamed the Ingobamakhosi Carbineers after a Zulu regiment that had fought against them (Note: When mustered for the war, in November 1878, the Natal Carbineers amounted to 3 officers and 57 men; 2 officers and 29 men fought at the Battle of Isandlwana on 22 January 1879 and 2 officers and 20 men were killed there. The rest of the unit, and their commanding officer, Captain Offy Shepstone were away from camp with a reconnaissance party.) at the 1879 Battle of Isandlwana.

The renamed units retained the battle honours of their predecessors. Units that had a traditional association with Scotland or Ireland (and so included "Scottish", "Irish" or "Highland" in their names) were encouraged to reuse the former name in a sub-unit which could continue the traditions, dress and music associated with these countries. Unit colours, insignia (such as cap badges and shoulder flashes) and associated symbols were initially allowed to remain unchanged, with units having three years to phase in new ones.

== Impact ==
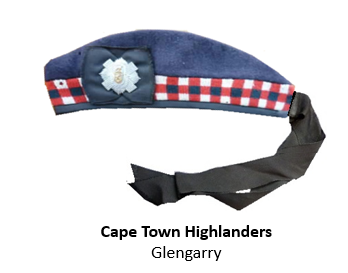
The traditional glengarry cap of the Cape Town Highlanders

The change led some units to parade without insignia and, in the case of a Johannesburg regiment, without uniform, as unit commanders chose not to use the old equipment. The change led to the loss of historically unique uniforms, such as that of the Transvaal Scottish, where sub-units did not carry on the traditional dress. Some of the old Colours of the units were laid up in museums or churches as they were replaced by new colours for the new unit names.

The name changes are estimated to have cost the SANDF 8 million rand. In 2019 the SANDF said the new unit names had been well-received by serving soldiers. At the time of the change Democratic Alliance MP Kobus Marais raised concerns that the changes were made purely for political reasons and that the changes would result in lower recruitment rates for the units.

The mayor of Cape Town, Dan Plato, wrote to the army chief of staff Lindile Yam to protest the loss of "Cape" or "Cape Town" from the titles of four of the regiments. Plato's letter stated that he was not aware that the city authirities had been consulted on the name changes and that they affected the brand of the area. In June 2022 it was noted that the Cape Town Highlanders, founded in 1885 as the first Highland regiment in the southern hemisphere and scheduled to be renamed the Gonnema Regiment, had yet to change their name and press reports suggested they had been permitted to retain their previous name. By this time the other three "Cape" regiments had been renamed. A DefenceWeb report of August 2026 used the Gonnema Regiment name so it is not clear if the unit has since transitioned to the new name.

By January 2021 only 2 of the 52 renamed units had been granted new heraldry and insignia. By August 2021 a further unit had completed its transition and there were just 5 further applications in progress. The date for transitioning to new insignia was extended in 2022 to the end of April 2023.

== List of changed unit names ==
The renaming is as per the DefenceWeb report of 7 August 2019; additional details on namesakes are cited inline. Units that were not renamed in 2019 include the Rand Light Infantry, Umvoti Mounted Rifles, Johannesburg Regiment, Kimberley Regiment and the Tshwane Regiment.

=== Infantry ===
Former name	New name	Former namesake	New namesake
Natal Carbineers	Ingobamakhosi Carbineers	Formed in the Colony of Natal in 1855, a carbine is a shortened rifle used by mounted soldiers.	Ingobamakhosi Zulu regiment who fought in the left flank of the Zulu line at the 1879 Battle of Isandlwana and fought against the Natal Carbineers.
Cape Town Rifles	Chief Langalibalele Rifles	Formed at Cape Town in 1855.	Langalibalele, king of the amaHlubi who rebelled against the British in 1873.
First City	Chief Makhanda Regiment	Raised as the First City Volunteers in 1875, the first military unit in the city of Grahamstown.	Xhosa witch doctor Makhanda who fought against the British in the 1818-1819 Fifth Xhosa War. Grahamstown, upon which he led an unsuccessful attack, was also renamed after Makhanda in 2018.
Prince Alfred’s Guard	Chief Maqoma Regiment	Formed in 1856 as the Port Elizabeth Volunteer Rifle Corps. Name granted by Alfred, Duke of Saxe-Coburg and Gotha during a visit in 1860.	Xhosa chief Maqoma who fought the British during the Sixth (1834–1836) and Eighth (1850–1853) Xhosa Wars.
Cape Town Highlanders	Gonnema Regiment - Not Made (Note: In June 2022 it was confirmed that this name change had not been made and it is thought to have been abandoned Quote: Mahapa said that "Cape Town Highlanders has not officially changed its name and remain known as the Cape Town Highlanders." They were still known as the Cape Town Highlanders when they exercised their freedom of entry to Cape Town in June 2023.) However, a DefenceWeb report of August 2026 used the Gonnema Regiment name so it is not clear if the unit has since transitioned to the new name.	Formed in Cape Town in 1885 by members of the Scottish diaspora, was the first Highland regiment in the southern hemisphere.	Khoekhoe chief Gonnema who fought the Dutch during the Second Khoikhoi–Dutch War of the 1670s.
Transvaal Scottish	Solomon Mahlangu Regiment (Note: There has been some controversy about this specific change of name, with critics citing the fact that the TRC found him to have been guilty of Gross Human Rights Abuses.)	Formed in 1902 at Johannesburg, in the newly founded Transvaal Colony, from members of the Scottish diaspora.	Solomon Mahlangu anti-apartheid fighter with the African National Congress, executed in 1979.
Witwatersrand Rifles	Bambatha Rifles	Formed in 1903 from former members of the Railway Pioneer Regiment and mine employees in the Witwatersrand region.	Zulu chief Bhambatha who led the Bambatha Rebellion against the British colonial authorities in 1906.
Regiment Botha	General Botha Regiment	Formed in Northern and Eastern Transvaal Province in 1934 and named after Louis Botha, Boer general of the Second Boer War.	Unchanged
Regiment de la Rey	General de la Rey Regiment	Formed in Western Transvaal Province in 1934 and named after Koos de la Rey, Boer general of the Second Boer War.	Unchanged
Regiment de Wet	Chief Albert Luthuli Regiment	Raised in the Orange Free State in 1934 and named after Christiaan de Wet, Boer general of the Second Boer War.	Albert Luthuli president of the African National Congress (1952-1967) and advocate for non-violent resistance, 1960 Nobel Peace Prize winner.
Regiment Westelike Provinsie	General Jan Smuts Regiment	Raised in 1934 from Afrikaans speakers, the title is the Afrikaans name for Western Cape Province.	Jan Smuts Boer leader in the Second Boer War, Allied general in the First World War and Prime Minister of South Africa in the Second World War.
South African Irish Regiment	Andrew Mlangeni Regiment	Formed in 1914 from first- and second-generation Irish immigrants.	Andrew Mlangeni anti-apartheid campaigner with the African National Congress, imprisoned along with Nelson Mandela at the 1963-64 Rivonia Trial.
Regiment Christiaan Beyers	Mapungubwe Regiment	Formed from the second battalion of the Regiment Botha in 1951. Christiaan Beyers was a Boer general of the Second Boer War.	The Kingdom of Mapungubwe, a medieval state in Southern Africa.
Regiment Piet Retief	Nelson Mandela Regiment	Formed at Port Elizabeth in 1940, it had originally been suggested to name the regiment after Jan Smuts, a Boer War and First World War general and the then prime minister of South Africa. Piet Retief was a Boer leader during the Great Trek.	Nelson Mandela, anti-apartheid campaigner and first black president of South Africa (1994-1999).
Regiment President Kruger	Lenong Regiment	Formed at Krugersdorp in 1954 and named, as is the town, after Paul Kruger, president of the South African Republic (1883–1902).	"Vulture" in the Sotho language, a name given to the advisors to Sotho chiefs.
Regiment Oos Rand	OR Tambo Regiment	Formed in 1960 at Benoni. An Afrikaans-speaking unit it was named after the Afrikaans name for the East Rand region.	O. R. Tambo anti-apartheid fighter and president of the African National Congress (1967–1991).
Durban Regiment	King Shaka Regiment	Formed at Durban in 1960.	Shaka king of the Zulu people 1816-1828. He strengthened the Zulu kingdom by expansion against its neighbours, leading to the Mfecane period of conflict across southern and central Africa.
Regiment Bloemspruit	Mangaung Regiment	Formed at Bloemfontein in 1964 and named after the Bloemspruit, a tributary of the Vals River.	Sotho for "place of cheetahs". The city of Bloemfontein became part of the Mangaung Metropolitan Municipality in 2011.
Regiment Noord-Transvaal	Job Masego Regiment	Formed at Pretoria in 1964 and its name is the Afrikaans for North Transvaal.	Job Maseko/Masego, a Native Military Corps soldier during the Second World War. Awarded the Military Medal for sinking a German freighter with an improvised explosive whilst a prisoner of war.
2 Parachute Battalion	Bagaka Regiment	Formed in 1971 as a reserve unit to support the regular 1 Parachute Battalion.	Tswana language for "legends" or "heroes".

=== Artillery ===
Former name	New name	Former namesake	New namesake
Cape Field Artillery	Nelson Mandela Artillery Regiment	Founded in Cape Town in 1857 as the Cape Town Volunteer Artillery. It went through several name changes including being named after Prince Alfred and became the Cape Field Artillery in 1932.	Nelson Mandela, anti-apartheid campaigner and first black president of South Africa (1994-1999).
Natal Field Artillery	King Cetshwayo Artillery Regiment	Formed as an artillery company of the Durban Rifle Guard in 1862, it became the Natal Field Artillery in 1892.	Cetshwayo, king of the Zulu people 1873-1879 who led their fight against the British in the Anglo-Zulu War of 1879.
Transvaal Horse Artillery	Sandfontein Artillery Regiment	Founded as the Lys Volunteer Corps in 1904. It became the Transvaal Horse Artillery Volunteers in September 1904 and dropped the Volunteers designation in 1908.	After the Battle of Sandfontein (German South West Africa) in 1914, the first foreign deployment of the Union Defence Force.
Vrystaat Artillerie Regiment	General Dan Pienaar Artillery Regiment	Formed as the Oranje Vrystaat Artillerie (Afrikaans: Orange Free State Artillery) in 1857.	Dan Pienaar South African officer of the First World War and general of the Second World War.
Transvaal Staatsartillerie	State Artillery Regiment	Established in 1881, the regiment's name was Afrikaans for "Transvaal State Artillery".	The Transvaal province was split in 1994 and the name is no longer used for any administrative sub-division of the country.
18 Light Regiment	Steve Biko Artillery Regiment	Formed under a numerical designation in 1978 as an airborne artillery unit.	Steve Biko, founder of the anti-apartheid Black Consciousness Movement, died in police custody 1977.

=== Air defence artillery ===
Former name	New name	Former namesake	New namesake
Cape Garrison Artillery	Autshumato Anti-Aircraft Regiment	Formed in Cape Colony in 1891.	Autshumato an early 17th-century Khoekhoe who acted as interpreter and agent for early English settlers at Cape Town.
Regiment Vaal Rivier	Galeshewe Anti-Aircraft Regiment	Afrikaans for Vaal River. The unit was formed in 1960.	Kgosi Galeshewe, a chief of the Batlhaping tribe who led anti-British uprisings in 1878 and in 1896 – 97.
Regiment Oos Transvaal	iWombe Anti-Aircraft Regiment	Founded 1964 and named after the Afrikaans for "East Transvaal". The unit was also known as die Rotte, from the abbreviation ROT.	The iWombe Zulu regiment, of which Shaka was a member.
6 Light Anti-Aircraft Regiment	Sekhukhune Anti-Aircraft Regiment	Founded in 1965 from personnel of the Regiment Oos Transvaal.	Sekhukhune, king of the Pedi people, who led his people against the Boers in the First Sekhukhune War of 1876 and the British in the Second Sekhukhune War of 1879.
44 Light Anti-Aircraft Regiment	Madzhakandila Anti-Aircraft Regiment	Raised in 1985 as an airborne unit associated with 44 Parachute Brigade.	

=== Armoured ===
Former name	New name	Former namesake	New namesake
Natal Mounted Rifles	Queen Nandi Mounted Rifles	Formed in the Colony of Natal in 1888 from a number of town-based units that had fought in the 1879 Anglo-Zulu War.	Queen Nandi of the Zulu people, mother of Shaka and regent during his absence on military campaigns.
Light Horse Regiment	Johannesburg Light Horse Regiment	Formed as the Imperial Light Horse at Johannesburg in 1899 for service in the Second Boer War. The "Imperial" designation was dropped as a result of South Africa's 1961 transition to a republic.	The city of Johannesburg where the unit was founded and is garrisoned (at Mount Collins).
Pretoria Regiment	Pretoria Armour Regiment	Formed at Pretoria in 1913 as an infantry regiment and received the additional title of "Princess Alice's Own" in 1930 after their colonel-in-chief Princess Alice, Countess of Athlone. Converted to an armoured regiment during the Second World War, they lost the "Royal" title because of South Africa's 1961 transition to a republic.	Unchanged
Regiment President Steyn	Thaba Bosiu Armour Regiment	Formed in 1934 as an infantry unit and named after Martinus Theunis Steyn, the last president of the Orange Free State. During the Second World War the unit was combined with the Regiment Botha to form an armoured regiment. In 1946 the Regiment President Steyn was re-established as an independent infantry unit. It converted to an armoured regiment in 1949.	Thaba Bosiu, a sandstone plateau in Lesotho and a stronghold for Moshoeshoe I. It remained unconquered during a series of wars against British settlers and the Orange Free State.
Regiment Oranjerivier	Blaauwberg Armour Regiment	Formed in 1952 as the "Regiment Noordwes-Kaap" (Afrikaans: North-West Cape Regiment) and renamed the same year as "Regiment Hertzog" after J. B. M. Hertzog, Second Boer War commander and prime minister of South Africa 1924-1939. Renamed after the Afrikaans for the Orange River in 1960.	The Blaauwberg mountain near Cape Town, where the unit is garrisoned.
Regiment Mooirivier	Molapo Armour Regiment	Formed as the "2nd Anti-Tank Regiment" in 1954, a refounding of a Second World War unit of the same name, it later became the "Regiment Hendrik Potgieter" after Hendrik Potgieter a Voortrekker. Renamed the "Regiment Mooirivier" in 1959 after the Afrikaans for Mooi River in Vaal province where Potgieter founded Potchefstroom.	Molapo, son of Moshoeshoe I, king of the Sotho people. A military commander during a series of wars against British settlers and the Orange Free State.

=== Engineer ===
Former name	New name	Former namesake	New namesake
3 Field Engineer Regiment	Ihawu Field Engineer Regiment	N/A	The personal shield (as opposed to the one issued for war) of a Zulu man.
9 Field Engineer Regiment	Umkhonto Field Engineer Regiment	N/A	Xhosa for "spear", also the common name of uMkhonto we Sizwe, the paramilitary wing of the African National Congress in the apartheid era.
44 Parachute Engineer Regiment	Ukhosi Parachute Engineer Regiment	N/A	"Eagle" in Xhosa and Zulu.

=== Signals ===
Former name	New name	Former namesake	New namesake
71 Signal Unit	Western Cape Signal Unit	N/A	Western Cape province
7 Signal Group	Gauteng Reserve Signal Unit	N/A	Gauteng province
84 Signal Unit	Kwa-Zulu Natal Signal Unit	N/A	KwaZulu-Natal province

=== Support units ===
Former name	New name	Former namesake	New namesake
30 Field Workshop	Doman Field Workshop	N/A	Doman, a Khoikhoi leader during the First Khoikhoi-Dutch War (1659–1660).
31 Field Workshop	General Sipho Binda Field Workshop	N/A	Lieutenant-General Sipho Binda, a "commander" with the Umkhonto we Sizwe and later the logistics branch of the South African National Defence Force.
32 Field Workshop	Sabelo Phama Field Workshop	N/A	Sabelo Phama, a nationalist guerrilla fighter and commander of the Azanian People's Liberation Army.
71 Field Workshop	Chris Hani Field Workshop	N/A	Chris Hani, leader of the South African Communist Party and chief of staff of uMkhonto we Sizwe, assassinated in 1993.
37 Field Workshop	Sekhukhune Field Workshop	N/A	Sekhukhune, king of the Pedi people, who led his people against the Boers in the First Sekhukhune War of 1876 and the British in the Second Sekhukhune War of 1879.
7 Field Workshop	Ngungunyane Field Workshop	N/A	Another name for Gungunhana, late 19th-century leader of the Gaza Empire in modern Mozambique. He became a symbol of the nationalist movement in the Mozambican War of Independence.
4 Maintenance Unit	Logistical Support Unit	N/A	N/A
11 Maintenance Unit	General Andrew Masondo Maintenance Unit	N/A	Lieutenant-General Andrew Masondo, a "commander" of the Umkhonto we Sizwe, national commissioner of the African National Congress and general of the South African National Defence Force with service including the role of Chief of the Service Corps.
19 Transit Maintenance Unit	Madiba Bay Maintenance Unit	N/A	Another name for Gqeberha (formerly Port Elizabeth), after the Xhosa clan name of Nelson Mandela (Gqeberha is part of Nelson Mandela Bay Metropolitan Municipality).
