= 1890s African rinderpest epizootic =

Viral epidemic among livestock in Africa

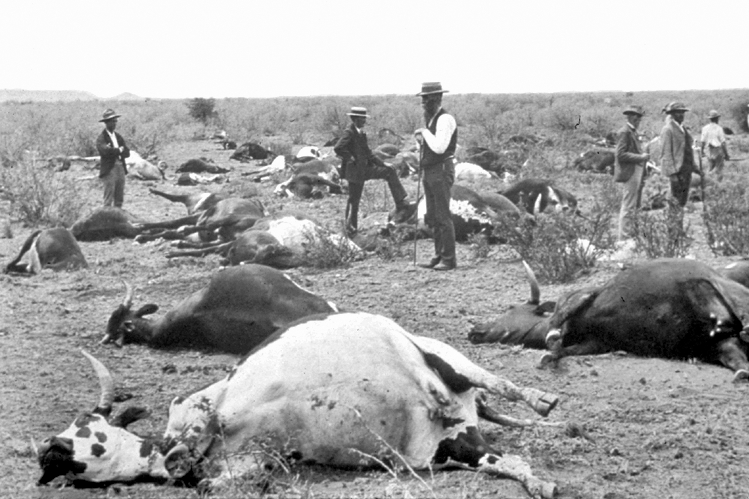
Cattle dead from rinderpest in South Africa, 1896

In the 1890s, an epizootic of the rinderpest virus struck all across Africa, but primarily in Eastern and Southern Africa. It was considered to be "the most devastating epidemic to hit southern Africa in the late nineteenth century." It killed more than 5.2 million cattle south of the Zambezi, as well as domestic oxen, sheep, and goats, and wild populations of buffalo, giraffe, and wildebeest. The effects of the outbreak were drastic, leading to massive famine, economic collapse, and disease outbreak in humans. Starvation spread across the region, resulting in the death of an estimated third of the human population of Ethiopia and two-thirds of the Maasai people of Tanzania.

The famine and the massive decrease in cattle population led to a change in the landscape from grass to thornbush. This formed the ideal habitat for tsetse fly and allowed them to expand from central and western Africa to the rest of the continent. Tsetse fly carry the parasite that causes the deadly African sleeping sickness. This disease, which affects both humans and animals, further exacerbated the economic and social effects of rinderpest on Africans. The Rinderpest epizootic facilitated further colonial conquest by creating famine, economic dislocation, and landscape transformations.

== Origin of rinderpest in Africa ==
Rinderpest had been common in Europe before the European colonisation of Africa. Despite the familiarity of Rinderpest to Europeans, it had ceased to be a problem in many countries, such as Germany, thanks to modern veterinary policing and cross-border regulation of the cattle trade. Rinderpest was introduced to parts of Africa by infected cattle imported from Asia to feed Italian forces during the Italo-Ethiopian War of 1887–1889. However, the disease did not cross the Sahara until the 1880s; its spread was rapid, trickling in from inland regions during German military campaigns of the 1880s and 1890s. Rinderpest was referred to as sadoka in East Africa. Evidence of the disease in Eritrean and Ethiopian cattle existed almost a decade before the epizootic in Southern Africa. The Emperor of Ethiopia was said to have lost over 250,000 cattle. In addition, a serious outbreak of rinderpest had been reported in Bombay in 1882. It spread throughout the Horn of Africa, and crossed the Zambezi in March 1896. Colonial officials in German East Africa along with other Europeans originally identified sadoka as being a separate disease from rinderpest, and argued that it was spread by Africans.

Many Africans believed the disease was spread intentionally by Europeans. A popular Ethiopian tradition asserts that their cattle was deliberately inoculated with rinderpest by the Italians as during the Italo-Ethiopian War.

== Impact of the rinderpest virus across Africa ==
Rinderpest was able to spread efficiently from the northeast to the south of Africa due to beneficial environmental conditions. The virus was spread though close contact at water sources such as watering holes and rivers where cattle and other mammals would gather. Local wild buffalo played a key role in the infection of the cattle of the Maasai people. In three years, rinderpest travelled 8000 km from the Southern Sahel Massawa, Eritrea to Dakar in West Africa although it took another year to travel south to the Zambezi before it infected groups in Bulawayo in modern Zimbabwe. In addition, Africa experienced a series of unfortunately timed meteorological El Niño-Southern Oscillation (ENSO) events between late 1880s to the early 1890s. This caused major droughts throughout the continent from the horn of Africa down to south Africa which caused massive concentrations of populations to gather at water sources. This encouraged the spread of the virus as it allowed large numbers to get infected quickly in a short amount of time. Frederick Lugard, the future Governor-General of Nigeria, stated: "Never before in the memory of man, or by the voice of tradition, have the cattle died in such vast numbers; never before has the wild game suffered. Nearly all the buffalo and eland are gone."

=== Rinderpest in Eritrea and Ethiopia ===
The rinderpest epizootic first swept through the coastal region of Eritrea in 1887. The disease swept across the northern provinces of Tigray and Shewa southwards, resulting in an estimated 90% mortality of the country's cattle population and wildlife, including buffaloes and antelopes. From there, it then reached through the Borena Zone of Southern Ethiopia in 18–30 days, Central Ethiopia in 8 days and Eritrea in 3 days. The severity of the rinderpest was influenced by which animals the communities depended on. As it left behind little to no cattle, communities such as the Maasai were hit hard while the Somali people and Gabra were almost untouched as they relied on camels.

==== Rinderpest among the Borana ====
The Borana people in Southern Ethiopia used a pastoral economy reliant on cows when the rinderpest arrived in August 1891. Cattle played an important role in marriages, as a food source, and in the maintenance of social security networks. As a result, the Borana was left without an economy and food. The only ones who managed to keep their herds alive were those who were already in remote areas. The ones who were hit the hardest were those relying on the Tula wells for water, as these became centres where infection spread. As the disease travelled, the wells and grazing land surrounding them were abandoned in fear of infection. Additional problems arose as the rinderpest also killed animals such as buffalo, Grant’s gazelle, and giraffes, meaning that predators like lions and hyenas had fewer alternatives when hunting. This led to increased predation of humans who were already weak from famine and smallpox outbreaks by these animals. In Northern Ethiopia, hyenas were particularly dangerous, and often dragged people out of their homes during the night. Hyenas often also dug up and consumed decaying human flesh.

Rinderpest primarily increased the disease burden among the Borana. For example, many people who ate the meat from rinderpest-riddled cattle often died of diarrhoea, probably as a result of the unsanitary condition of the meat. In the late 1880s, the region was also experiencing a smallpox epidemic. Smallpox was exacerbated as the mass migration of people attempting to avoid the rinderpest outbreak led to increased infection. Whole families died out as a result of the epizootic.

The rinderpest epidemic also caused a restructure of Borana society. The survivors of the epizootic organized themselves into larger settlements around the wells, both to keep the wells open and functional but also as a precaution against predators. In addition, in response to the famine, customary rules and taboos around food had been abolished. Community chiefs enacted policies that declared all rules and taboos to be forgiven, and strict laws were enacted to prevent further "rule breaking." Europeans travelling through the area, like H. S. H. Cavendish, made remarks on the prosperity of the land only a handful of years after the Rinderpest swept through the area.

In modern times, the Borana uses term the ciinna, meaning ”termination of everything”, for the overall impact the pest had on the society. Oral historians who were later interviewed about the epizootic declared that "it was the worst time in Borana history, which we do not want to be reminded of, but also which we cannot forget."

=== West Africa ===
In addition to Eastern and Southern Africa, rinderpest also spread across West Africa and decimated the cattle of the Hausa-Fulani people. 80–90% of all the cattle of the Fulani died. Rinderpest is believed to have arrived in the Ouaddaï Region by 1891, and Parfait-Louis Monteil's expedition into West Africa encountered "cattle plague" in what is now Dori, Burkina Faso in April of 1891. In French West Africa and German Cameroon, 98% of all the cattle in the region had died. In Hausa, the epizootic was referred to as "sannu," from an Hausa greeting of sympathy. The devastating loss of cattle of the Fulani is said to have driven many of the Fulani insane, where Fulani cattle owners were said to have left their families and wandered unclothed, looking for their dead cattle. The disease had a long-effect on the nomadic lifestyle and economy of the Fulani. It returned and killed cattle during the years 1913–14 and 1919–20. As late as 1944, the Fulani believed that their new cattle, which they had obtained by buying expensive unborn calves, were inferior to the cattle of the pre-rinderpest time.

=== German East Africa ===
Germans were ignorant of the extent and complexity of many human and livestock diseases in Africa, including rinderpest. In Tanzania, rinderpest was associated with massive wildlife mortality, which often accompanied or preceded the death of cattle by rinderpest. This further caused the disease to go largely unnoticed, as rinderpest was not associated with wildlife mortality by the Germans. Despite the massive amount of cattle death among the Maasai, the epizootic was only shown concern by the Germans when the livestock around ports and military stations began to die. The German response to rinderpest often included border controls, as well as preventative slaughtering of otherwise healthy cattle, increasing dissatisfaction and anger among the local population.

Among the Maasai people, who were primarily pastoral cattle herders, rinderpest contributed to mass famine, and often forced them to rely on outside ethnic polities that practice agriculture, like the Wayambo. For the Samburu, another pastoralist society in the region, it was regarded as the "Green Death."

=== Bechuanaland ===
The virus damaged various areas of society for pastoralists in Southern Bechuanaland (modern-day Botswana), as cattle was crucial to their survival. They relied on their livestock as their only source of income and cattle were a large percent of the colonial economy. Moreover, Southern Bechuanaland was a very dry region, which meant there was a lack of water sources that farmers could use. Thus, farmers were forced to take their livestock to the select few water holes in their areas which meant they were mixing with the infected wild mammals. The Bechuanaland colonial government did not collaborate with the Tswanas and Boers in managing the disease, leading to further spread of the disease across the region.

=== Southern Africa ===
Similarly in Cape Colony, particularly in the Eastern Cape, oxen were both crucial to the agrarian systems. A declining population of the cattle caused by rinderpest caused massive famine and starvation. As a result of this, many communities turned to skinning and dried out the meat of the large number of carcasses to preserve them; however, this was only a temporary solution to famine. The loss of cattle because of rinderpest also affected other aspects of life across Africa. Cow manure was a useful material that was used in various ways in African countries, including to plaster walls and floors, and also as a natural fertilizer on the land. The loss of cattle further affect agriculture by forcing farmers to find an alternative to manure and farm in new ways to bring yield.

Disease epidemics had afflicted both humans and livestock for many decades before the rinderpest epizootic. Between 1860-1895, the Natal and Zululand regions had suffered from drought and stock disease. White traders introduced Contagious bovine pleuropneumonia, which by 1872 had killed 50% of all the cattle in the Zulu Kingdom. Horse sickness had killed a large portion the equine population, and Bluetongue disease killed most of the sheep between the 1860s to 1870s. Thus, the introduction of rinderpest devastated the already weakened agricultural systems and economies of southern Africa. This primarily affected transport riders, who were engaged in the haulage of goods by ox-wagon between gold mines in the Natal and Witwatersrand gold fields. This also led to the killing of tends of thousands of transport oxen who were killed as a way of stamping-out rinderpest, which brought heavy losses to Natal's ox-drawn transport system. This primarily affected black peasants in the region.

Rinderpest impoverished many hundreds of black peasant tenants and caused them to either be driven off the land or made them more indebted to white landlords. This was seen as beneficial for many colonialists, who saw this as a way to move Africans away from traditional methods of farming and cattle herding to developing habits of industry and waged labor. In Southern Africa, rinderpest seemed to have even benefited white settlers. While both whites and blacks lost cattle, in 1896 black farmers owned 494,402 and by 1898, they owned 75,842. It took more than 8 years for black farmers to recoup their losses.

The South African farming sector had also been weakened prior to rinderpest due to an infestation of red locusts in 1895 and 1896. Large swarms of locusts migrated from the northeast to the south coastal area of KwaZulu-Natal in August 1895. They caused massive amounts of damage to whole mealies and sugar cane fields. This resulted in major loss for farmers who invested in their field but were left with no crops to sell due to extreme damage.

The rinderpest epidemic seriously disrupted the socio-economic norms of the Nguni societies, who had evolved around cattle as a source of wealth. It not only eradicated many chief's sources of storable wealth, it threw their entire social system into disarray. Marriage was even thrown into disarray, as cattle were used to meet the commitments of bridewealth (ilobola) that was to be given to prospective fathers-in-law. Thus, marriages were postponed, and the system of loaning cattle to the poor, or ukusisa, was also abolished.

== Effect of Rinderpest on environmental landscape ==
As a result of the rinderpest epizootic, cattle disappeared across Eastern Africa. As a result, many forms of wild organisms reclaimed these former cattle pastures, including tsetse fly. In addition, former cattle herders who, having lost their economic livelihoods, turned to hunting, which forced them to encroach into bush areas with increased populations of tsetse fly. Sleeping sickness, a parasitic disease transmitted by tsetse fly, was endemic to Africa and outbreaks of the disease had been documented for many centuries, for example, the Malian king, Mari Djata II of Mali, is reported to have died of it in the 14 century. As a result of bites from tsetse fly, thousands of Africans contracted sleeping sickness. Between the years of 1900–1904, 200,000 out of the 300,000 inhabitants of the infected regions of Eastern and Southern Africa died of sleeping sickness.

Another reason for the spread of African sleeping sickness via the rinderpest epizootic was the severe impact the epizootic had on agriculture. Farmers abandoning their fields caused them to revert to bush, which was the preferred habitat of tsetse flies. This primarily also led to an outbreak of sleeping sickness in Tanganyika during World War I. In addition, the rebound of wildlife killed by rinderpest often increased the amount of tsetse flies, and thus increased fatalities of sleeping sickness.

== Political responses to the Rinderpest epizootic ==
Throughout Africa, the colonial governments had different responses to the rinderpest epizootic. In Southern Africa, white farmers seem to have benefited from the epizootic, as it forced more black peasants off the land and into wage labor, and many white farmers were able to reap high profits by selling stocks to Africans who needed rinderpest free cattle. The average price of "salted" or rinderpest-free cattle quadrupled in price between 1895 and 1905.

Many governments like the government of the Colony of Natal enacted mandatory quarantines and halted the movement of cows. Movement was often crucial to the cattle-based societies of the Nguni and Maasai people, and thus, these "erratic" quarantines often did little to prevent the spread of the epidemic, but maximized the societal collapse of these people. In many ways, colonial governments ignored the spread of rinderpest. The governor of Natal, Walter Hely-Hutchinson, noted that "it gave him much pleasure to bear testimony to the patient and cheerful way in which the Native population had borne their severe losses through rinderpest."

Among the Borana people, the few domesticated animals to survive in Borana areas were donkeys and horses. Across Africa, equine mammals were important in helping communities start rebuilding themselves. Horses, in combination with dogs, were used to aid in hunting of game, while donkeys were used as pack animals and helped restart trade and social networks.

=== Rebellions ===
The response of many of the European colonial governments in Africa to the spread of rinderpest was the preventative slaughter of healthy cattle, often to protect European livestock. This angered many native Africans, which was exacerbated by the fact that cattle killed by Europeans were burned and buried, while dead cattle was often consumed in times of famine. The devastating impact of the loss of cattle instigated more conflict between local Africans and European settlers. In Southern Africa, Galeshiwe, the chief of the Batlhaping tribe, declared that "he would never permit his cattle to be shot." This later led to the Langeberg Rebellion (1896–97). The efforts of the British South Africa Company to stamp out the disease using quarantines, trade bans, and extermination of healthy cattle that came into contact with suspicious herds was the primary cause of the Second Matabele War, in which the spiritual leader of the Matabele, Mlimo, incited the local population by stating that white settlers were responsible for the rinderpest epizootic, as well as the simultaneous locust plagues, and cattle diseases of the region.

== End of the epizootic ==
There were few veterinarians on the ground to identify the disease, and observations of wildlife mortality, which was not considered a characteristic of European rinderpest, confused diagnoses. Despite attempts at veterinary policy, like the Cape Animal Diseases Act, most veterinary policy failed at halting the epidemic. This, along with the fact that it was feared Africans would uprise in mass against colonial governments, encouraged the development of a rinderpest vaccination. The South African Republic and German government, largely in southern and eastern Africa, worked to find an effective vaccine. By 1897, vaccine therapies succeeded in limiting rinderpest mortality to less than 20% in the Cape Colony. However, rinderpest remained an unsolved and ongoing problem in other parts of Africa throughout the 20th century, and became enzootic in most of Africa. Outbreaks also continued to be present in Korea, Japan, China, and the Philippines. By the 1960s, the International Rinderpest Joint Project (JP-15) campaign came close to eradicating rinderpest from Africa. It continued to have high mortality in animals like the Lesser kudu, giraffes, and warthogs. Famine and civil unrest caused by political violence halted the eradication and led to future epizootics throughout the 1980s, primarily in the Horn of Africa. Rinderpest was declared eradicated on May 25, 2011.
