= Toto Makgolokwe =

Toto Makgolokwe was the paramount chief (kgosi) of the Batlharo tribe of South Africa, dubbed the Freedom Warrior and an icon of the land whose resistance to colonization galvanized the freedom struggle. In 1897, he became the hero of The Langeberg Rebellion (1896–97) after defeating the British military. The British subsequently brought in reinforcements which defeated the Batlharo (Batswana tribe) and captured both Makgolokwe and Kgosi Galeshewe. Kgosi Toto's eldest son Robanyane Toto was also arrested with him at Robben Island.

Toto was convicted for protecting and sheltering Galeshewe. Toto died at Robben Island and Kgosi Galeshewe died at Magogong, Phokwane, Taung in 1927 after over 20 years in prison at different intervals.

Most of the Batlharo tribe reside in and around Kuruman, John Taolo Gaetsewe District Municipalities like Heuningvlei village which is under the leadership of Kgosi Bareki. The other Batlharo people live in Namibia, after vacating when the Langenberg war began.

== See also ==
- Langeberg Rebellion (1896–97)
