= Luka Jantjie =

Luka Mpolokeng Jantjie

Personal details
- Born: 1835 South Africa
- Died: 1897 (aged 61–62) Kimberley

Kgosi (Chief) Luka Jantjie was a hunter, trader, diamond prospector, and farmer. He was a chief of the Batlhaping ba Manyeding group of the Batswana in Kuruman. He was born in general area of what is now Kimberley, South Africa in about 1835 and was the son of a Christian convert. Jantjie spent most of his life protecting the rights to land of his people and is considered a struggle hero for his battle against British colonialism. He was the cousin of Kgosi Galeshewe.

== Resistance and conflict ==
When diamonds were discovered in Kimberley in 1871, British colonists from the Cape Colony swarmed onto Jantjie's land in search of diamonds and took it over. Jantjie and his people were the first local people whose ancestral land was stolen from them due to diamond prospecting by colonists. Jantjie was outspoken against the land invasion, however, he initially took a non-violent approach towards the British which included boycotting the rural trading stores. In addition, Jantjie fought for his people to attain equal rights to purchase diamond licenses so that they could share in the wealth that was being excavated on their land. However, the government of the Cape Colony refused to grant mining rights to native groups. Jantjie took up arms in response and orchestrated skirmishes against the British. Jantjie's confrontations with British authorities earned him the epithet of being “a wild fellow who hates the English”.

Over the next decade, the Batlhaping, Tlharo and Rolong people were evicted from much of their land and confined to reserves. In 1895, the area was annexed by the Cape Colony which resulted in Tswana groups being moved to even smaller reserves. These groups were also forced to pay taxes such as the hut tax, to work on white farms, and as migrant mine workers for the Kimberley mine. In addition the Rinderpest regulations and the shooting of cattle owned by Africans in the Taung Reserves were undertaken. After Jantjie's cattle were shot, he demanded of the policeman in charge, Corporal Denyssen, to know why his cattle were shot. He was shown a policy on Rinderpest and cattle roaming out of the owner's territory. He then demanded compensation from the corporal, which was refused. These events sparked the Langeberg Rebellion. The rebellion was led by Batlhaping chief Kgosi Galeshewe.

== Death and Significance ==
In August 1897, the colonial police invaded the Langeberg Mountains where Jantjie and other rebels had orchestrated a fight against the colonial force. After the Langeberg Uprising in 1897 also known as 'Galeshewe's War or 'Ntwa ya Matlhabanelo (an uprising led by Kgosi Jantjie, Kgosi Toto and Kgosi Galeshewe), a British invader, captain of the Cape Town Highlanders (James Samuel Searle) led the mutilation of Kgosi Jantjie’s body.'

In a cave on the Ga-masepa Kopje near Olifantshoek, Jantjie opened fire upon James Samuel Searle's approach with his companions, killing two Searle took this opportunity and shot Jantjie in the head with a revolver. The rebel leader (as they had described him) Luka Jantje, who had died bravely in the fight against the colonial forces, was buried where he fell. Soon afterwards Searle offered 5 pounds to anyone who would bring him Jantje’s head. 5 pounds was a lot of money and in short order he had the head. As a sign of humiliation, it was reported that, while Jantjie was dying, Searle and his troops posed to take photos with him, decapitated his corpse and took his head as a trophy.

Jantjie's death is regarded as the collapse of the Tswana resistance. In the aftermath, 4 000 men, women and children of the Bwere were taken captive and sent to the Cape Colony to work as unpaid labour for local white farmers. Many of the rebels were hanged for their contribution in orchestrating the rebellion. The rebellion officially ended on 3 August 1897 following the death of over 1 500 men. Currently there is no record of where Jantjie's remains are buried, nor the fate of his skull.

In 2011 the book Luka Jantjie: Resistance Hero of the South African Frontier was published. Authored by Kevin Shillington, the book recounts Jantjie's legacy and contributions. In April 2016, a building on Sol Plaatje University campus, Kimberley, was renamed Luka Jantjie House in Jantjie's honor.

== See also ==
- Kgosi Galeshewe
- Kimberley, Northern Cape
- Batswana
- Bechuanaland
- Rolong tribe
- Tswana people
- Rinderpest
- Taung
