= 35 Engineer Support Regiment =

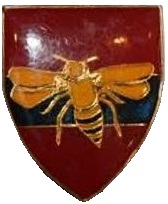
- 35 Engineer Support Regiment
- Active: 1946 - present
- Country: South Africa
- Allegiance: Republic of South Africa; Republic of South Africa
- Branch: South African Army; South African Army
- Type: Military engineering
- Size: Regiment
- Part of: South African Army Engineer Formation; Army Conventional
- Garrison/HQ: Dunnottar
- Motto: Sustincere vincere est" support for victory
- Colors: Guardsman Red and Oxford Blue
- Engagements: South African Border War

Insignia
- Collar Badge: Bursting grenade with nine flames
- Beret Colour: Oxford blue
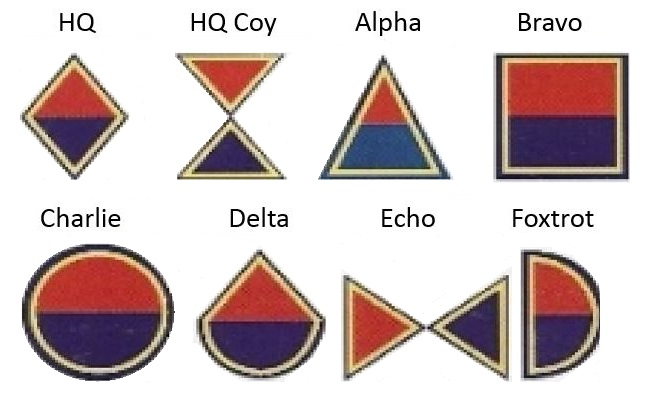
- Engineers Company Emblems

- Engineers Beret Bar circa 1992

35 Engineer Support Regiment is a regiment of the South African Engineer Corps. The role of the unit is to be the depot of prime mission equipment for the engineer corps.

== History ==
=== Origin ===
Originally established at Kroonstad as 35 Field Park Squadron but later renamed 35 Engineer Support Unit. The unit was moved to Mariedale near Springs and renamed 35 Engineer Support Regiment with the number 35 being replaced on its flash by the bee.

=== Leadership ===
- Col Gerrit Janse van Vuuren
- Lt Col Sam Mbonani

=== Insignia ===
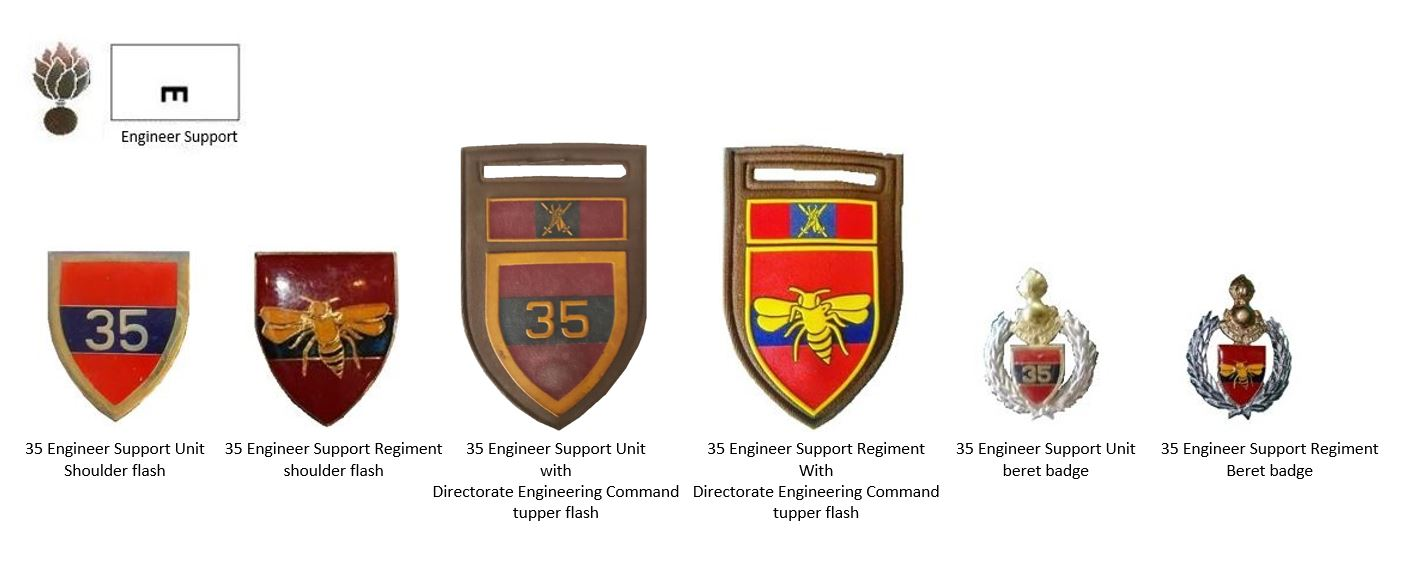
SADF era 35 Engineer Support Regiment insignia
