= Hieronymous Cruse =

Hieronymous Cruse (Jeronimus Croase) (died 20 June 1687) was a soldier and explorer for the Dutch East India Company in South Africa.

== Background ==
During the early years of the East India Company's presence in South Africa, the interior of the country remained largely unexplored. Cruse was one of a number of explorers tasked with discovering routes through the interior and gathering intelligence on local tribes. Cruse reportedly excelled at compiling information on the indigenous peoples.

== Early expeditions ==
His earliest expedition in South Africa was in 1663, when he took part in an unsuccessful expedition to interior under Jonas de la Guerre in an attempt to find an overland route to the Orange River. Cruse was the first to discover a route from Table Bay to Mossel Bay and Outeniqualand in 1668, where he discovered the Attakwa tribe. A year earlier, he had also discovered the Gourits River.

== Military career ==
In September 1670, Cruse (a sergeant at the time) was commanding a post at Saldanha Bay when he came under attack by Admiral De la Haye of the French East India Company. Cruse and his men were temporarily taken prisoner.

In July 1673, Cruse was sent to aid a group of burghers who had come under attack from the tribal warlord Gonnema. The burghers had been slain long before the rescue party arrived, but Cruse had also been tasked with leading a retributive attack. He and his men attempted an attack on Gonnema's kraal, but the warlord and his men escaped to the mountains and Cruse had to be content with capturing their livestock.

In later years Cruse was promoted through the ranks of the military, and as a lieutenant was invited in 1674 to join the Governor's policy council. In 1685 he was appointed to the colony's high court of justice under Hendrik van Rheede. He died of an unspecified illness on 20 June 1687.
