= 2 Field Engineer Regiment (South Africa) =

2 Field Engineer Regiment SAEC
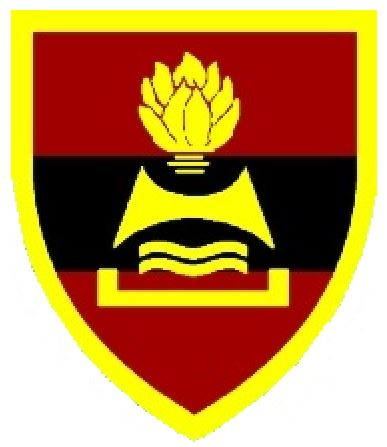
- SANDF 2 Field Engineer Regiment emblem
- Active: 1946 - present
- Country: South Africa
- Allegiance: Republic of South Africa; Republic of South Africa
- Branch: South African Army; South African Army
- Type: Military engineering
- Size: Regiment
- Part of: South African Army Engineer Formation; Army Conventional
- Garrison/HQ: Bethlehem
- Nickname: 2 Field
- Motto: Ubique/Fac et Gloria
- Colors: Guardsman Red and Oxford Blue
- Engagements: South African Border War

Insignia
- Collar Badge: Bursting grenade with nine flames
- Beret Colour: Oxford blue
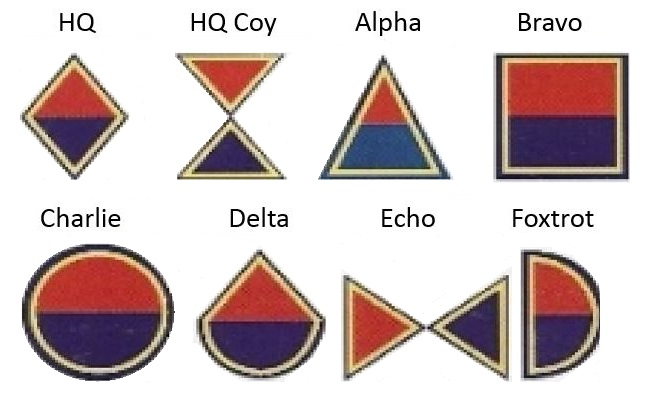
- Engineers Company Emblems

- Engineers Beret Bar circa 1992

2 Field Engineer Regiment SAEC is a regiment of the South African Engineer Corps. The unit is based in Bethlehem, Free State. The role of the unit is to maintain mobility and serviceability of own forces and counter mobility of enemy forces. Tasks include bridging, water purification, obstacles, demolition, infrastructure repair and development.

== History ==
=== Origin ===
2 Field Engineer Regiment was formed in 1946 and disbanded in 1958 until, in 1962 the Regular Force was formed with 17 Field Squadron for support...

=== Training ===
2 Field Engineer moved to Bethlehem in 1967 as a training unit and finally in 1974 it was renamed 2 Field Engineer Regiment consisting of 21, 22 and 23 Field Squadrons with 24 and 25 Field Squadrons as additional support for the operational area of South West Africa.

26 Field was a temporary base in the area of Gerhards Dam (now labelled Gerrands Dam) at -28.285710, 28.286980 operational in 1986 for basic training of National Service troops. Facilities were limited, and single brick ablution block, a number of corrugated iron bungalows (troop accommodation), some pre-fab structures (offices, officer accommodation) and a corrugated iron mess hall with a 250-man field kitchen placed at one end.

=== Insignia ===
==== Previous Insignia ====
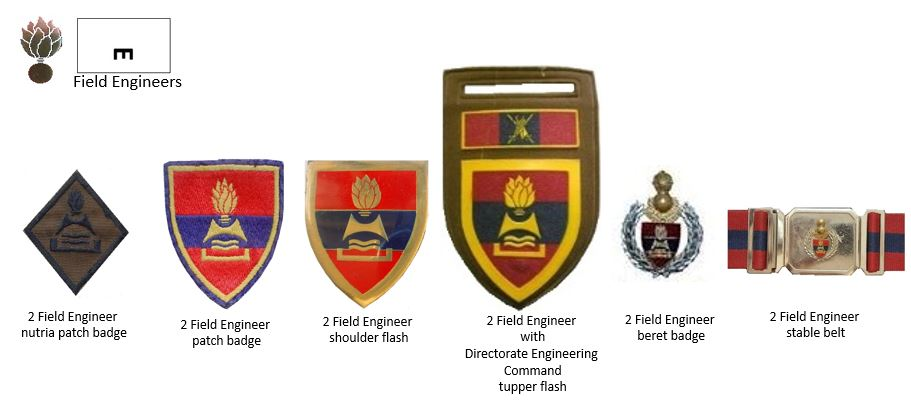
SADF era 2 Field Engineer Regiment Insignia

== Function ==
The main function of 2 Field Engineer Regiment is to provide mobility to, and ensuring the survivability of the landward forces of the SANDF, and to deny the mobility of the enemy when needed.

In the draft South African Army Vision 2020 force design, the 2007 organograms published with Leon Engelbrecht's unpublished manuscript A Guide to the SANDF chart 2 Field Engineer Regiment as the field engineer regiment of the Armoured Brigade (Free State) within the Mechanised Division (headquarters Wallmansthal), supporting 1 SA Tank Regiment, the paired reserve tank regiment (Pretoria Regiment / Regiment President Steyn), 1 SSB and 1 SAI. This is done through:

- mine warfare,
- water purification,
- bridge building,
- demolitions,
- basic field engineering,
- obstacles,
- defensive works and
- watermanship.
