= Willis Nkosi =

South African Army officer

Major General Willis A. Nkosi
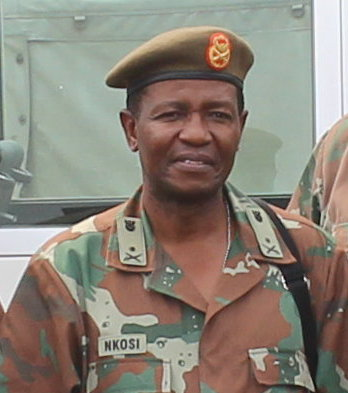
- Military career
- Allegiance: South Africa
- Branch: South African Army
- Service years: –2020
- Rank: Major General
- Commands: Chief of Army Force Structures; GOC South African Army Engineer Formation
- Awards: Operational Medal for Southern Africa Service Medal South Africa Service Medal

Major General Willis A. Nkosi was a South African Army officer. He served as General Officer Commanding (GOC) South African Army Engineer Formation. and finally as the Chief Director Army Force Structures from 1 March 2018 until his resignation in March 2020.

== Military career ==
- Served in Nepal in 2007/8 as a Sector Commander

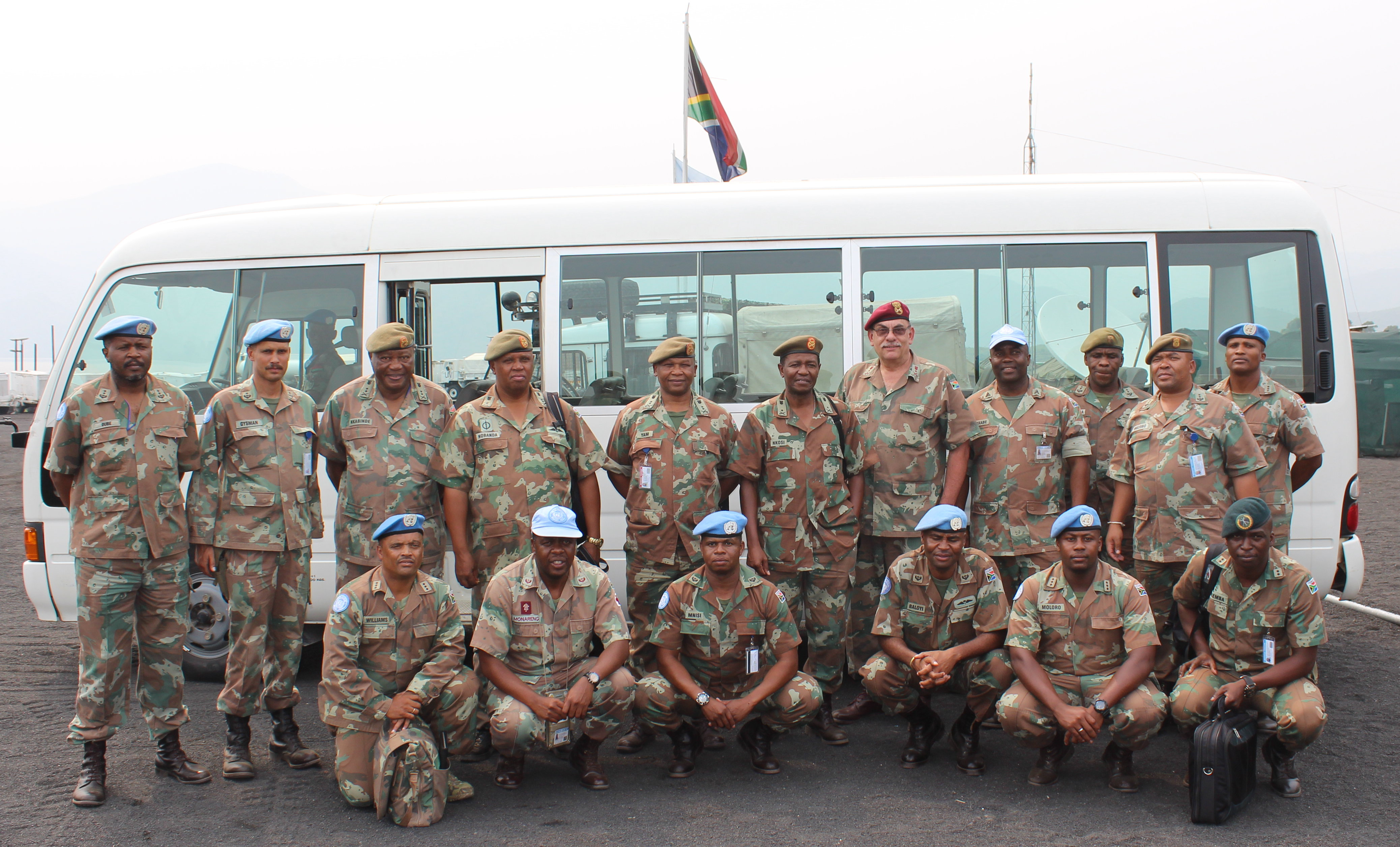
SANDF VIP Visit FIB DRC 2014.

Military offices
Preceded by Deon Holtzhausen	Chief of Army Force Structures; 2018 – 2020	Succeeded by Sandile Hlongwa
Preceded by Mbulelo Msi	GOC South African Army Engineer Formation n.d. – 2018	Succeeded by Nkhabu Nthenjane
