= South African Army Engineer Formation =

South African Engineer Formation
- Active: 1982 to present
- Country: South Africa
- Branch: South African Army
- Type: Military engineering
- Role: To enhance mobility and survivability of own forces
- Mottos: Ubique (Everywhere); Primus incidere exire ultimus (First in and last out)
- Colors: Guardsman Red and Oxford Blue

Commanders
- Ceremonial chief: Chief of Staff Col F. T. Farao

Insignia
- Collar Badge: Bursting grenade with nine flames
- Beret Colour: Oxford blue
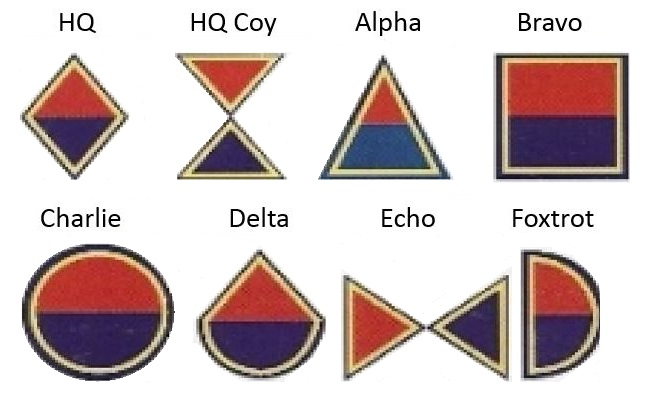
- Engineers Company Emblems

- Engineers Beret Bar circa 1992

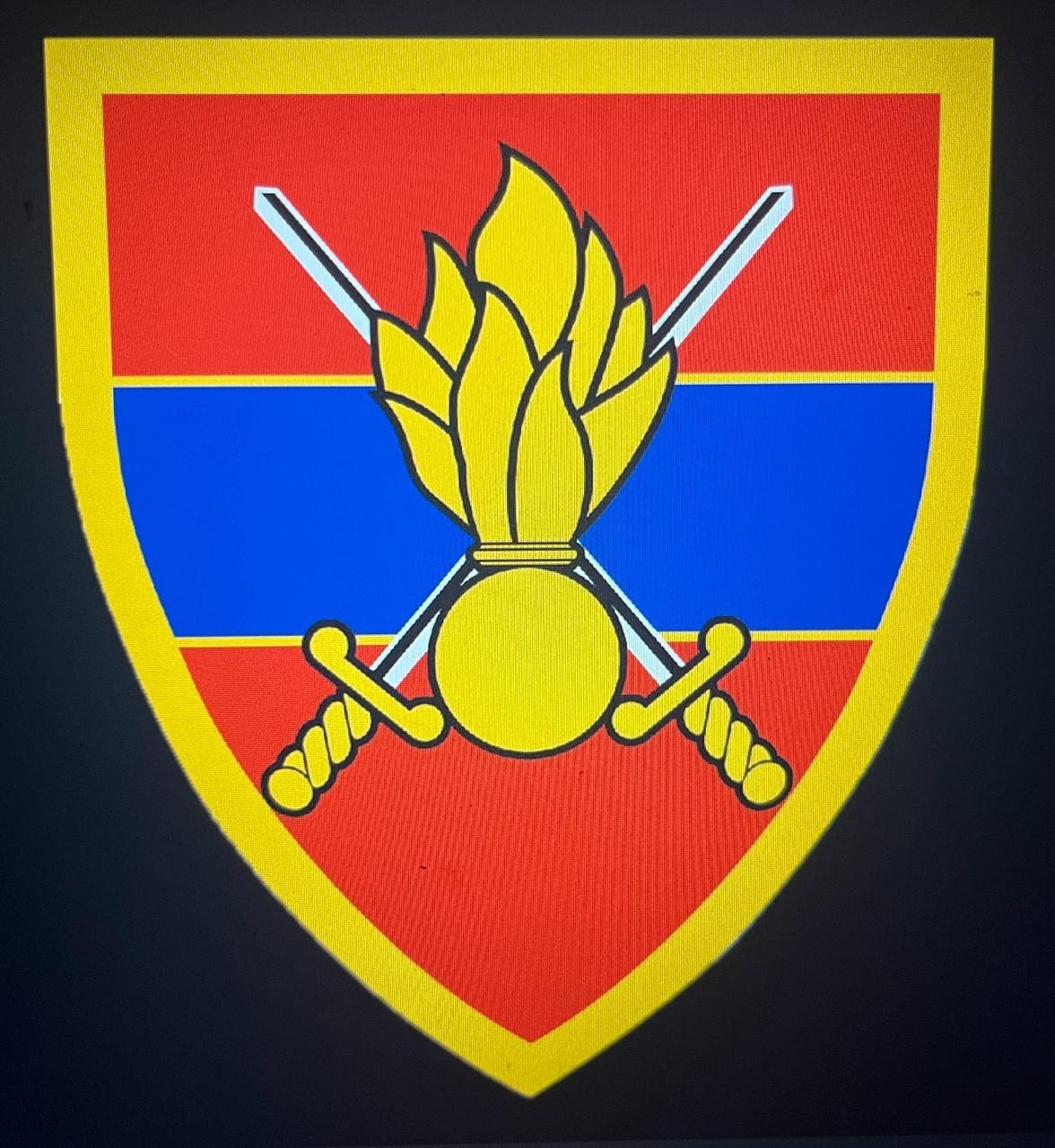
SA Army Engineer Formation emblem

The South African Army Engineer Formation is the controlling entity of all South African Army military engineering units. The Formation is currently commanded by the General Officer Commanding (GOC); Brigadier General Willis Nkosi

== History ==
=== Relationship with the Corps of Royal Engineers ===
==== Cape Volunteers Engineer Corps ====
Military Engineers first made their appearance in South Africa during the Colonial era in 1859 the Governor of the Cape Colony authorised the establishment of the Cape Engineers (Volunteers), which in 1861 became simply the Cape Engineers. In 1865, the title was changed to the Cape Volunteer Engineer Corps, but in 1869, the Corps literally faded away. Ten years later in 1879, the Corps was resuscitated under the name Cape Town Volunteer Engineers. These sappers supported the ground forces during the Frontier Wars and even as far afield as Basutoland.

==== Natal Engineer Corps ====
In 1910, the Natal Engineer Corps was formed but ceased to exist in 1913, a year after the passing of the Defence Act in 1912. Just before the outbreak of World War I in 1914, the Cape Fortress Engineers were formed to relieve Imperial Troops occupied on sapper tasks in the fixed defences of the Cape Peninsula.

==== South African Engineer Corps ====
The South African Engineer Corps was established in 1922 when the Royal Engineers withdrew from South Africa with the rest of the British Army garrison. The Cape Fortress Engineers was disbanded in 1933 and two more Field Companies were formed in 1935 and numbered one to six, being located in order at: Durban, Uitenhage, Cape Town, Bloemfontein, Johannesburg and Pretoria.

==== World War II ====
During the period 1940–1945, the SA Army Engineer Corps which had started the war with a strength of 54 officers and 585 sappers, rose to the strength of approximately 16 000 men belonging to over 70 different companies or units.

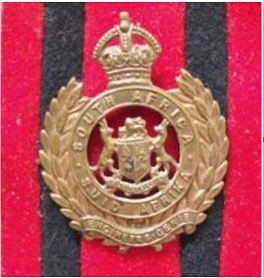
Union Defence Force World War II era Engineer Corps Cap badge

In the development of the Corps, three aspects of military engineering had to be considered and the obvious sapper groups were the Base, Lines of Communication and Field or Fighting Groups, each with its own particular tasks but motivated by the basic requirements of maintaining the mobility and comfort of the ground forces.

Hence, the 70 different units covered the whole spectrum of military engineering, such as:

- close support Field Companies and their Field Park Companies,
- Road Construction Companies,
- Railways,
- Harbours and Tunneling Companies,
- Survey Companies,
- Water Supply and Treatment Companies,
- Workshop and Engineer Stores Units and Chemical Warfare,
- Bomb Disposal and Camouflage Units, in all, 31 different functions and disciplines.

===== The origin of the bursting grenade =====
On 29 December 1944, in recognition of outstanding achievements by the SA Army Engineer Corps during World War II, King George VI approved the design of the Corps emblem, a bursting grenade, to be a device of 9 flames instead of the original seven, and authorised the use of the motto "Ubique", meaning "Everywhere". This is the same as that of the Corps of Royal Engineers and has been incorporated in the cap badge.

==== Post World War II ====
The Active Citizen Force was resurrected in early 1946 and Government Notice 1540 of 19 July 1946 announced the establishment and designation of several ACF units including two engineer regiments.

One of these regiments was 2nd Regiment S.A.E.C. which consisted of Headquarters 2nd Regiment S.A.E.C. and 1, 2 and 3 Field Squadrons and 8 Field Park Squadron. The regiment was disbanded in 1966 and 3rd Field Squadron became independent.

In 1957 the Mobile Battalion was established, which later became the Mobile Watch, then 1 Comp Construction Regiment, then 1 Construction Regiment before being disbanded in 1968.

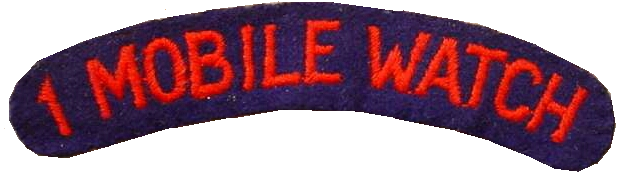
UDF era 1 Mobile Watch Shoulder title

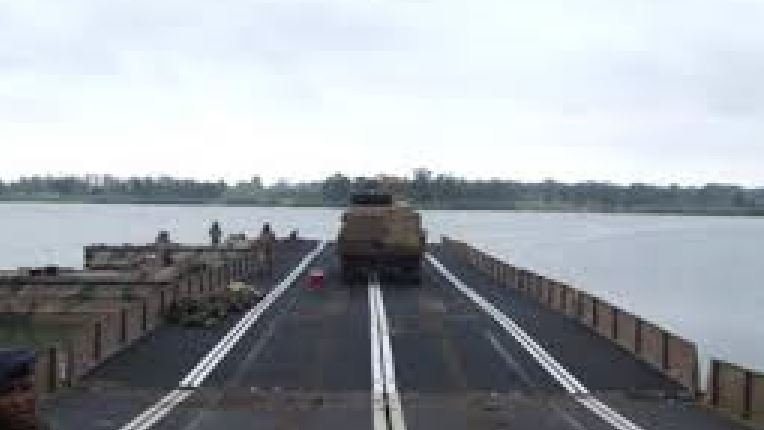
SANDF Pontoon Bridge

In 1962, the Regular Force was formed and 17 Field Squadron was created to support this force, stationed in Potchefstroom. However, in 1967 it was moved to Bethlehem and became a purely training unit. In 1974, it became two new squadrons, 24 and 25 Field Squadrons as support squadrons in the operational area of South West Africa.

In 1969, the Directorate of Engineers was established at Kroonstad, but in 1972 it was moved to SA Army Headquarters, Pretoria where it was developed to what it is today. In 1968, the 35 Field Park Squadron was established as a Regular Force Unit and in 1974 was renamed 35 Engineer Support Unit and stationed at Kroonstad. In 1975, the South West Africa Engineer Support Unit was formed and stationed at Grootfontein. Also in 1975, arising out of all the Survey and Printing activities of the Survey and Printing Units of World War II, the 47 Survey Squadron, a Regular Force Unit, was formed. This Unit trained all the National Servicemen posted to it and in turn fed the two DF Survey Units which had been established - the 46 Survey Squadron at Cape Town in 1959 and the 45 Survey Squadron at Pietermaritzburg in 1969

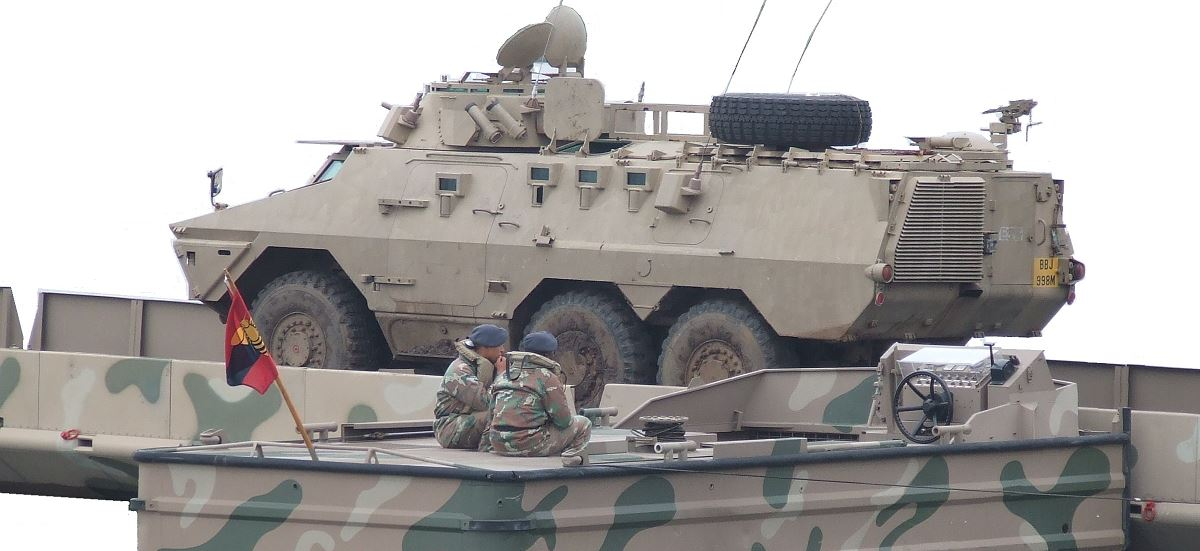
SANDF Pontoon Bridge and boat

1 Construction Regiment was re-established at the end of 1976 at Marievale near Springs, Gauteng and towards the end of 1977 was tasked with the construction of the Military Base at Dukuduku on the Natal North Coast. Subsequently, due to policy changes, its activities were confined to the operational area, in support of the SA Army, with great success.

In 1982 the Chief of the South African Army decided to create the SA Army Engineer Formation, with the Director of Engineers as Officer Commanding, which would give him increased functional and operational control over all Engineer units. On 26 November 1982, the Chief of the Army, Lieutenant General Johannes Geldenhuys presented the Command Directive for the formation to the Director of Engineers.

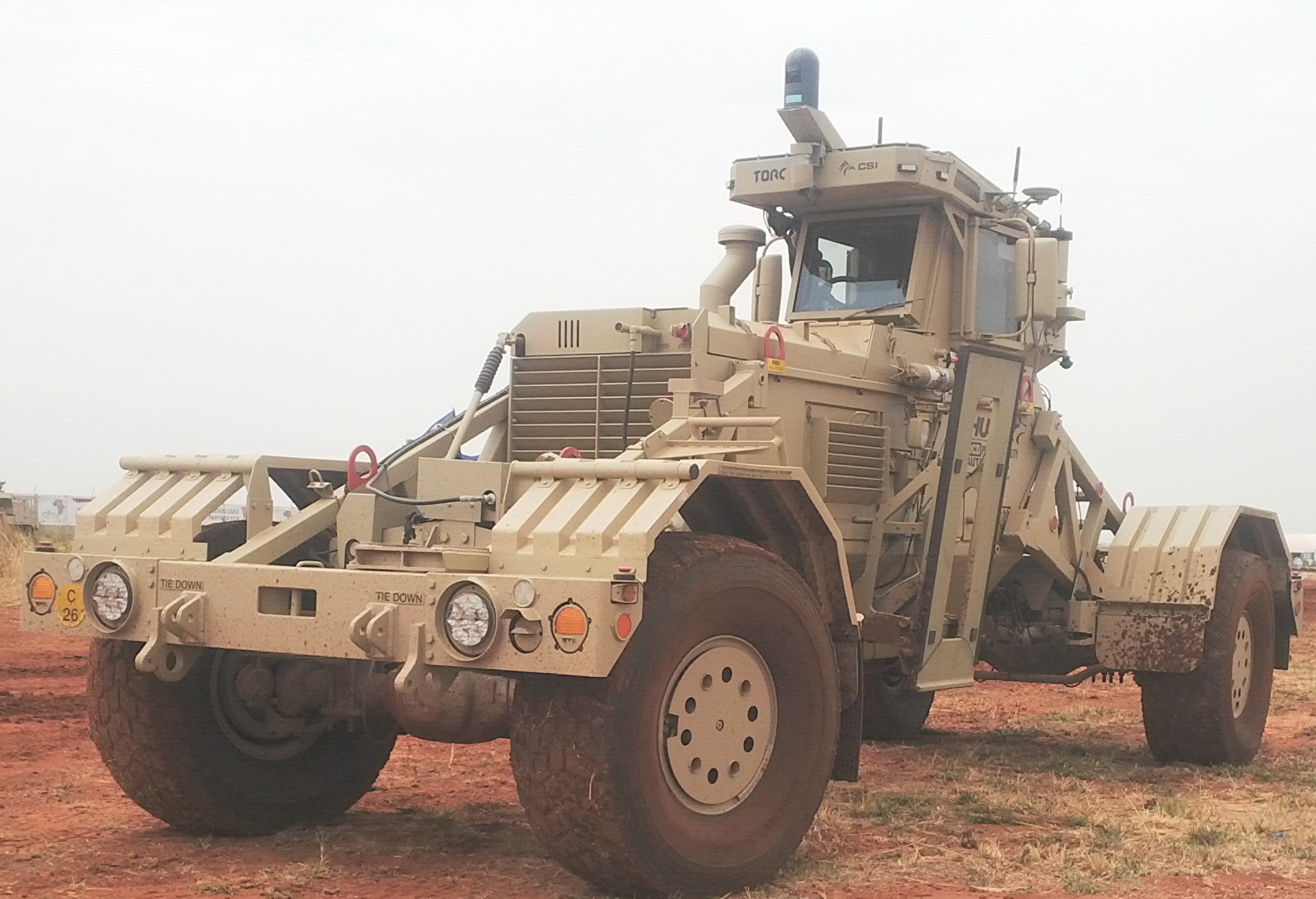
SANDF Husky mine detection vehicle

==== From Corps to Formation in the SANDF ====
With the creation of 'type' formations after the South African Defence Review 1998, the Engineer Formation was reformed and all units of the South African Engineer Corps were placed within a single-corps grouping.

== Units ==
The Formation consists of both regular and reserve units: Its headquarters is at Thaba Tshwane.

=== Regular Units ===
- School of Engineers (South Africa). (Kroonstad) - Primary Training Centre for the SAAEF. (Part of General Support Base Kroonstad)
- 2 Field Engineer Regiment. (Bethlehem) - Primary Deployment Unit of the SAAEF. The regiment was formed in 1973 from 17 Field Squadron, which had relocated to Bethlehem from Potchefstroom in 1967. The main function of 2 Field Engineer Regiment is to provide mobility to, and ensuring the survivability of the landward forces of the SANDF, and to deny the mobility of the enemy when needed. This is done through mine warfare, water purification, bridge building, demolitions, basic field engineering, obstacles, defensive works and watermanship. The unit was deployed extensively during the war in Namibia, but has also rendered support in disaster relief operations, such as Merriespruit and during floods in KwaZulu Natal and Limpopo.
- 35 Engineer Support Regiment. (Dunnottar) - Unit responsible for the maintenance of all Engineering equipment. (Part of Military Base Dunnottar)
- 1 Construction Regiment SAEC. (Dunnottar) - Unit responsible for all construction and Building maintenance work. Mostly Plumbers, Electricians and Builders are stationed here. (Part of Military Base Dunnottar)
- Engineer Terrain Intelligence Unit (Thaba Tshwane) - Compilation and production of maps and other printed material. (Formed from the merger of 1 Military Printing Regiment and 4 Survey and Mapping Regiment.)

=== Reserve Units ===
- Ihawu Field Engineer Regiment, in Cape Town. In 1966 with the disestablishment of 2 Regiment SAEC, 3rd Field Squadron became independent. On 25 January 1983 3 Fd Eng Sqn was expanded to a regiment. The Regiment attended "Exercise Thunder Chariot" in 1984 and in the years that followed saw riot control service before once again proving their worth in 1988 and 1989 as conventional warfare troops.
- Umkhonto Field Engineer Regiment, Durban
- Ukhosi Parachute Engineer Regiment

3 Field Squadron took part in Operation Savannah in 1976

=== Closed Units ===
- 14 Engineer Regiment - Same as 1 Construction Regiment.
- 4 Field Engineer Regiment - Field Regiment.
- 6 Field Engineer Regiment - Field Regiment.
- 9 Field Engineer Regiment - Field Regiment.
- 20 Field Engineer Regiment - Field Regiment.

Engineer Formation Structure

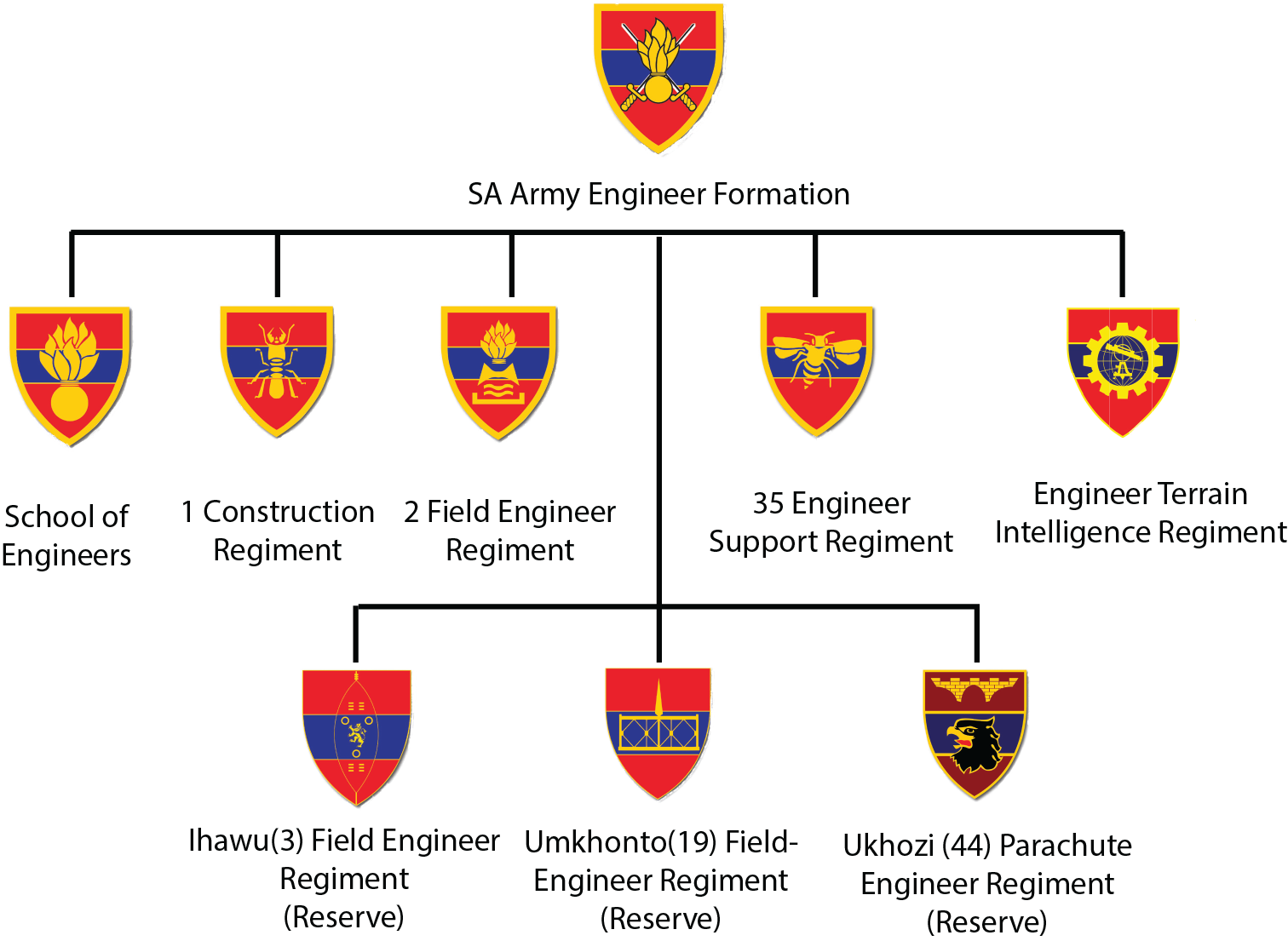
SA Army Engineer Formation and units structure

== Insignia ==
Engineer Insignia
Demolitions (Qualification) Level 1 (DEMS1). Black on Thatch beige, Embossed. The badge uses the traditional 9 flames exploding grenade which is superimposed over one lightning bolt diagonally (top right to bottom left) across the exploding grenade	Demolitions (Qualification) Level 2 (DEMS2) - Tactical Demolitions. Black on Thatch beige, Embossed. The badge uses the traditional 9 flames exploding grenade, which is superimposed over two crossed lightning bolts across the exploding grenade	Improvised Explosive Device Disposal (IEDD) (Qualification) IEDD Badge. Black on Thatch beige, Embossed. The badge uses the traditional 9 flames exploding grenade, which is superimposed, over two crossed lightning bolts. A watch dial, with hour markings, encircles the exploding grenade

== Leadership ==
SA Army Engineer Formation Leadership
From	General Officers Commanding	To	Ribbon
c. 2000	Brigadier General David Masters	c. 2003	
c. 2009	Brigadier General Luvuyo Nobanda	31 October 2011	
1 November 2011	Brigadier General Mbulelo Msi	nd	
nd	Brigadier General Willis Nkosi	nd	
From	Formation Sergeants Major	To	Ribbon
	No known incumbents		

== Equipment ==
The Formation uses the following equipment, among others:

=== Combat Engineering ===
Variant	Origin/Design	Comment	Image
KMW/MAN Leguan 8X8 Bridge Layer	Germany	Kraus Maffei Leguan bridge system on MAN 8X8 heavy truck platform	Krauss Maffei Leguan MAN 8X8 bridge layer
Oliphant Bridge Layer Tank	South Africa	Armoured bridge layer	Oliphant Bridge Layer Tank
Modular Bailey Bridge	United Kingdom South Africa	Temporary bridge made of prefabricated steel panels that can be rapidly assembled	SANDF bailey bridge
Foldable Floating Bridge System	South Africa		
Assault boat Mark 4	South Africa	Rigid type outboard-powered shallow draft crew of 2, can carry 13 troops and or 2 tons of cargo	
Meerkat Mine Detection Vehicle	South Africa	Primary mine detector, 3 meter wide array with metal detection and ground penetrating radar	SANDF Meerkat mine detection vehicle
Husky with Mine Detonation Trailers	South Africa	Towed mine detonation, high pressure will set off nonmetallic mines, each trailer has 2 axles of different length, so that all 3 trailers provide a full 3 meter wide cover	SANDF Meerkat with mine detonation trailers
Zettelmeir Vlakvark	South Africa	Battle tractor, landmine protected, different attachments for excavation, front end loading, back hoe or forklifting. Can create or enhance obstacles, clear fire lanes and rubble, create river crossings, can move parts of girder bridges and unload bulk cargo.	SANDF Zettelmeir Vlakvark Battle Tractor
Plofadder 160 AT	South Africa	Rocket propelled minefield clearing system, usually mounted on Buffel or Casper APCs, can clear mines up to 160m long by 8m wide using about 500 kg of exsplosives	Plofadder backpack mount
MMD Mark 3	South Africa	Metal Detector	SANDF MMD Marks 3 Metal Detector

=== Construction Engineering ===
Variant	Origin/Design	Comment	Image
Waterbuffel	South Africa	Mobile water pumping, filtering, purification and storage system	Waterbuffel water purification system
MOGS	South Africa	Mobile Operational Geographic System	
Heavy duty Hauler and Lowbeds	Germany	Various types, Mainly MAN and Mercedes Benz	
Wheeled dozer	Japan	Various types, mainly Komatsu, used also to create obstacles for opposing forces and defensive positions	
Full tracked dozer	United States	Various types, mainly Caterpillar and Michigan	SANDF D11 bulldozer
Dump trucks	South Africa Japan	Various types, mainly SAMAG and Nissan Diesels	SANDF SAMAG 120 Tipper
Road Graders	United States	Various types, mainly Cat Wright and Galion	SANDF Road Grader
Front end loaders	South Africa	Various types	
