= Engineer Terrain Intelligence Unit =

Engineer Terrain Intelligence Regiment
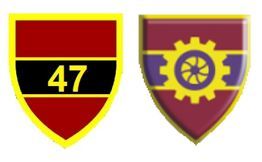
- Active: 2010 - present
- Country: South Africa
- Allegiance: Republic of South Africa
- Branch: South African Army; South African Army
- Type: Military engineering
- Role: Surveying, printed and digital cartography
- Size: Regiment
- Part of: South African Army Engineer Formation; Army Conventional
- Garrison/HQ: Sappers Heights, Pretoria
- Nickname(s): ETIR
- Motto(s): Ubique
- Colors: Guardsman Red and Oxford Blue

Insignia
- Collar Badge: Bursting grenade with nine flames
- Beret Colour: Oxford blue
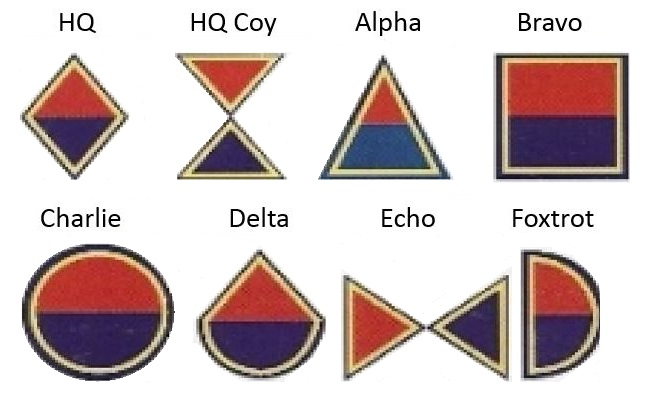
- Engineers Company Emblems

- Engineers Beret Bar circa 1992

The Engineer Terrain Intelligence Regiment is a regiment of the South African Army Engineer Formation. The unit is based in Pretoria, Gauteng. It is responsible for providing the cartography needs of the South African Army.

== History ==
Engineer Terrain Intelligence Regiment is the amalgamation of 4 Survey and Mapping Regiment and 1 Military Printing Regiment.

=== 47 Survey Squadron ===
47 Survey Squadron was established in 1975 with a mandate to deliver mapping of foreign countries used by soldiers. 47 Survey Squadron produced the reproduction material used in the maps of foreign countries, the RSA border and military training areas.

47 Survey Squadron was relocated from Germiston in 1994.

=== 1 Military Printing Regiment ===
1 Military Printing Regiment was established in 1975 with a mandate to deliver mapping to soldiers. 1 Military Printing Regiment was responsible for the printing of the maps.

1 Military Printing Regiment was relocated from Koedoespoort in 1994.

=== Amalgamation ===
The new Terrain Intelligence Regiment is a combination of these two units with a clear mandate to provide operational geographical support to clients within the DOD in the specific fields of mapping, surveying, navigation, terrain negotiability, printing and operational photography. The new Terrain Intelligence Regiment underwent changes in terms of technology, upgrading and this will enhance the service. The unit deploys internally and externally with the mobile operational geographic squadron that can provide the same capabilities as the static unit stationed in Pretoria.
