= Bagaka Regiment =

2nd Parachute Battalion Bagaka Regiment
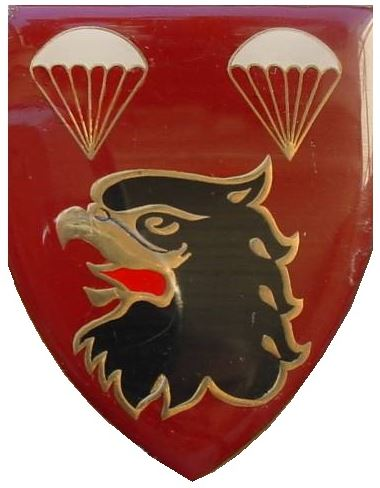
- Active: July 1971 – present
- Country: South Africa
- Allegiance: Republic of South Africa; Republic of South Africa
- Branch: South African Army; South African Army
- Type: Infantry (Paratroopers)
- Role: Airborne infantry
- Size: Battalion
- Part of: South African Infantry Corps; Army Conventional Reserve
- Garrison/HQ: Tempe, Bloemfontein
- Nickname: Parabats

Insignia
- Abbreviation: BAGR

The Bagaka Regiment (formerly 2 Parachute Battalion) is a reserve airborne infantry regiment of the South African Army.

== History ==
=== Origins ===
With the implementation of one year National Service in South Africa in 1968, 1 Parachute Battalion struggled to administer the Permanent Force and the Citizen Force Parabats. To prevent the loss of these trained national servicemen at the end of their one-year service to other units of the South African Defence Force, it was decided to form a new citizen force parachute unit to take these men. The battalion was formed at Tempe in July 1971 of five rifle companies. On 20 April 1978, the 2 Parachute Battalion and other parachute units became part of the newly formed 44 Parachute Brigade.

=== Operations ===
2 Parachute Battalion would take part in Operation Savannah in Angola during 1975 and covered the withdrawal of the SADF forces from that country in early 1976. In May 1978, elements of this battalion took part in the parachute drop over Cassinga during Operation Reindeer. Companies from this battalion were based on the border with Angola in South-West Africa/Namibia and used as a rapid reaction force to counter incursions by SWAPO's PLAN forces into that country. 2 Parachute Battalion companies were also deployed internally in South African black townships to suppress unrest to the governments Apartheid policies.

=== Name change ===
In August 2019, 52 Reserve Force units had their names changed to reflect the diverse military history of South Africa. 2 Parachute Battalion became the Bagaka Regiment, and have 3 years to design and implement new regimental insignia.

== Leadership ==
Leadership
From	Honorary Colonel	To	Ribbon
	No known incumbents		
From	Officer Commanding	To	Ribbon
	No known incumbents		
From	Regimental Sergeants Major	To	Ribbon
	No known incumbents		
