= Kgosi Galeshewe =

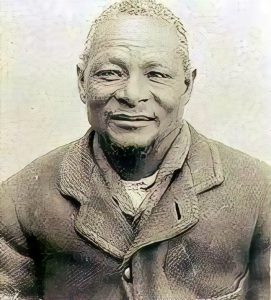

Personal details
- Born: 1840 South Africa
- Died: 1927 (aged 86–87) Magogong

Kgosi (Chief) Galeshewe, (c. 1840 - 1927), was a chief of the Batlhaping group in South Africa. He was an anti-colonial revolutionary and orchestrated rebellions against the Cape Colony government. The Galeshewe Township in the Sol Plaatje Local Municipality, Kimberley, has been named after him. A South African Navy fast attack craft has also been named after him. Galeshewe was born in 1840 near Taung, South Africa.

== Revolutionary activity ==
After diamonds were famously discovered in Kimberley in the mid-1800s, colonists from the Cape Colony began to move into the interior in search of opportunities at the soon to become profitable diamond mines. The settler colonies (mostly British) moving into the interior closer to the extraction plains came into direct conflict with many indigenous people living near the Orange River. By the 1870s the second Diamond rush was underway. A rebellion led by Galeshewe broke out against the Cape Colony government on 18 July 1878 at Cornforth Hill, Kimberley, after a decision was made to cull the rural cattle population in order to combat a Rinderpest epidemic.

More than 17 cattle that belonged to the Batlhaping people had strayed out of their reserve and into a white farmer's plot of land. The farmer shot all of them citing his fears over rinderpest spreading to his own livestock. The matter was taken to court, with Galeshewe's cousin Petlhu demanding compensation, but the magistrate ruled in favour of the farmer as straying cattle was strictly prohibited. No compensation was given. It became known as the Phokwane Rebellion. As cattle was used as currency by the majority of local groups, this decision by the colonial government sparked outrage.

While Galeshewe was in the Transvaal trying to get support from the Boers against the actions of the British, leaders of the Phokwane Reserve refused to allow police officials on the reserve to investigate what happened with the cattle. The Cape government considered this an act of rebellion. Galeshewe joined forces with the Tlharo and the Rolong groups, where skirmishes were led against colonial traders and farmers in retribution against the cattle culling. The rebellion resulted in Galeshewe's capture by Colonel C Warren's troops on 26 August 1878. On 6 October 1879, Galeshewe was sentenced to 12 years in prison for his part in the uprising. Once he had completed his sentence, Galeshewe amassed forces with neighbouring groups in the Langeberg Rebellion where he was captured again and sentenced to 10 years in prison. After a month in prison, Galeshewe escaped but was captured once more a month later and imprisoned. When Galeshewe escaped, he and the leader of the Batlhaping, Luka Jantjie, were attacked by the Cape Colonial Force that was 2000 men strong. It is said the colonial troops carried with them 7 and 12-pounder artillery along with Maxim machine guns.

Galeshewe was ambushed in Langeberg by the Cape Colonial Force, who were the under the charge of Colonel Edmund Dalgety, a commander of the Cape Mounted Rifles. Galeshewe managed to escape, even though five of his men were shot and killed. He set north towards Bechuanaland (modern-day Botswana). A search party led by George Dennison took off from Vryburg in the Orange Free State, whose instructions were to intercept Galeshewe before he crossed into Bechuanaland.

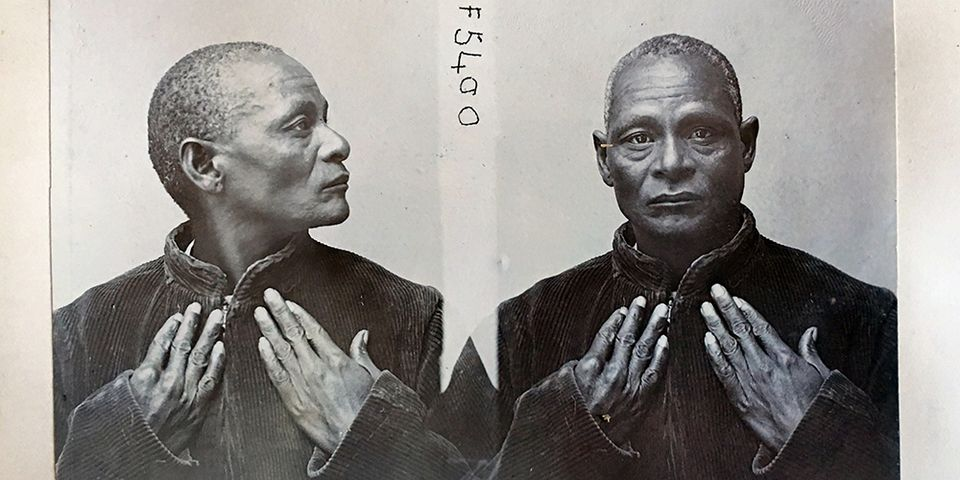
Prison photographs of Kgosi Galeshewe, 1898

Dennison and his army of farmers travelled along the Molopo River for the good part of three weeks, patrolling the area and taking prisoner any local Batswana that may have had key information regarding Galeshewe's movements. It is reported that Galeshewe was travelling with his uncle Morebonoke, his brothers Mootametsi, Telekela and Mogodi. On 26 August 1897 Galeshewe was tracked down and surrounded by Dennison and his search party. He then served a 10-year sentence in prison on Robben Island. In 1898, the Batlhaping lost their land in Phokwane, as well as Galeshewe's farms which were confiscated by the Cape Colony government in response to Galeshewe's actions. The Batlhaping were then forced to settle at Magogong where they were placed under the chieftaincy of Molale. Some of his people were executed for participating in the rebellion while some were moved to the Cape Colony as free labour. Luka Jantjie was shot in the chest and killed instantly after a brief gun battle with the Cape Colonial Force. A surgeon was commissioned to cut his head off and boil it. Galeshewe died at Magogong, north of Hartswater, in 1924.

== Honours and significance ==
- Galeshewe posthumously received the Order of Mendi for Bravery in Gold for "His bravery in leading a rebellion against repressive laws of the colonialist government and for economic emancipation of his people".
- The South African navy has named one of its ships after Galeshewe
- The biggest township in Kimberley is named Galeshewe
- On 27 April 2018 the Northern Cape government unveiled a monument to honour Kgosi Galeshewe, Luka Jantjie and Kgosi Toto for their efforts in fighting back against colonial oppression. The event was held at the Kuruman Information Centre.
- In August 2019, the South African Army announced the renaming of select Army Reserve units, one among them being the Kimberley-based Regiment Vaalrivier, to Galeshewe Anti-Aircraft Regiment
