= Gonnema =

Gonnema was a Khoekhoe chieftain of the Cochoqua people in 17th century South Africa. He was the primary antagonist of the Dutch East India Company in the Second Khoikhoi–Dutch War.

Despite the Company's opposition to war with the Khoekhoe, individual soldiers aroused the ire of the Cochoqua by looting their cattle. By the early 1670s, Gonnema and his people were sufficiently incensed to take up arms. In 1673, Gonnema murdered a hunting party of eight burghers. A commando (militia) unit led by Ensign Hieronymous Cruse was sent against him, which failed to capture the Cochoqua's kraal. However, they were successful in taking prisoners, who were subsequently executed. Gonnema's men also attacked and plundered the Company's fort at Saldanha Bay. Beyond these attacks, Gonnema waged a primarily defensive strategy for the remainder of the hostilities.

The following year a combined force of Europeans, burghers and Khoekhoe (the Goringhaiqua and Gorochouqua peoples) was sent against Gonnema, but again failed to capture him. Rather than retaliating immediately, Gonnema responded by preventing the local Khoekhoe peoples from trading with the Europeans, although in November 1674 he raided the Europeans' Khoekhoe allies. He attacked the Goringhaiquas and Gorochouquas again at Tygerberg in early 1675, where fifteen Cochoqua people were killed by Dutch East India Company reinforcements. Gonnema himself, however, escaped once again.

Another commando unit was sent against the Cochoqua in 1676, but again they failed to capture Gonnema, returning instead with a handful of prisoners and several hundred head of cattle.

By 1677, Gonnema was willing to sue for peace, an act which was well received by the Dutch. A settlement was reached whereby Gonnema's people would pay the Dutch a tribute of 30 head of cattle each year.
