= Gerhard Kamffer =

General Officer in the SA Army Reserves

- Military career
- Allegiance: South Africa
- Branch: South African Army
- Service years: 1973–2023
- Rank: Brigadier General
- Commands: Director: Army Reserves; Director: Project KOBA-TLALA
- Conflicts: South African Border War
- Other work: Businessman

Brigadier General Gerhard Kamffer is a Reserve general officer in the South African Army.

== Military career ==
Kamffer started his military career with national service in 1973 where he served as a platoon commander at 4 SAI, based at Middelburg in what is today Mpumalanga.

He was Officer Commanding of the now disbanded Heidelberg Commando for nine years and in 1998 was appointed SSO Commandos at South African Army Headquarters with the substantive rank of Colonel.

He successfully completed the Senior Command and Staff Duties course at the South African Army College. In 2005 he was promoted to Brigadier General and the following year he successfully completed the Executive National Security programme at Defence College.

On 17 February 2021, he was transferred from the post of Director: Army Reserves to the post of Director: Project KOBA-TLALA.

=== Project KOBA-TLALA ===
This project was created as a result of an initiative by Defence Minister Nosiviwe Mapisa-Nqakula as an attempt to use the Reserve Force to assist in rural development. Project KOBA-TLALA had the further objectives of upskilling reserve force soldiers and providing them with gainful employment while they were not serving on active duty. One of the notable outcomes of the project has seen some members achieving SAQA accredited training As the project developed, it was proposed that it would be converted into a "Production Brigade" and becoming self-sustaining, reducing the burden on the Defence Force budget.

=== Renaming of Reserve Force units ===
Gen Kamffer was responsible for managing the project to rename the Reserve Force units which had been identified as needing it.

== Other work ==
General Kamffer serves on the Editorial Advisory Board of the journal Scientia Militaria – the South African Journal of Military Studies.

Military offices
Preceded by Maj Gen Keith Matila Mokoape	Director: Army Reserve; 2013 – 2020	Succeeded by Brig Gen Freeman Mxolisi Moni
Unknown	Director: Project KOBA-TLALA / PRODUCTION BRIGADE; 2020 – present	Unknown
Unknown	SSO Commandos; 1998 – n.d.	Unknown
