= Batlhaping clan =

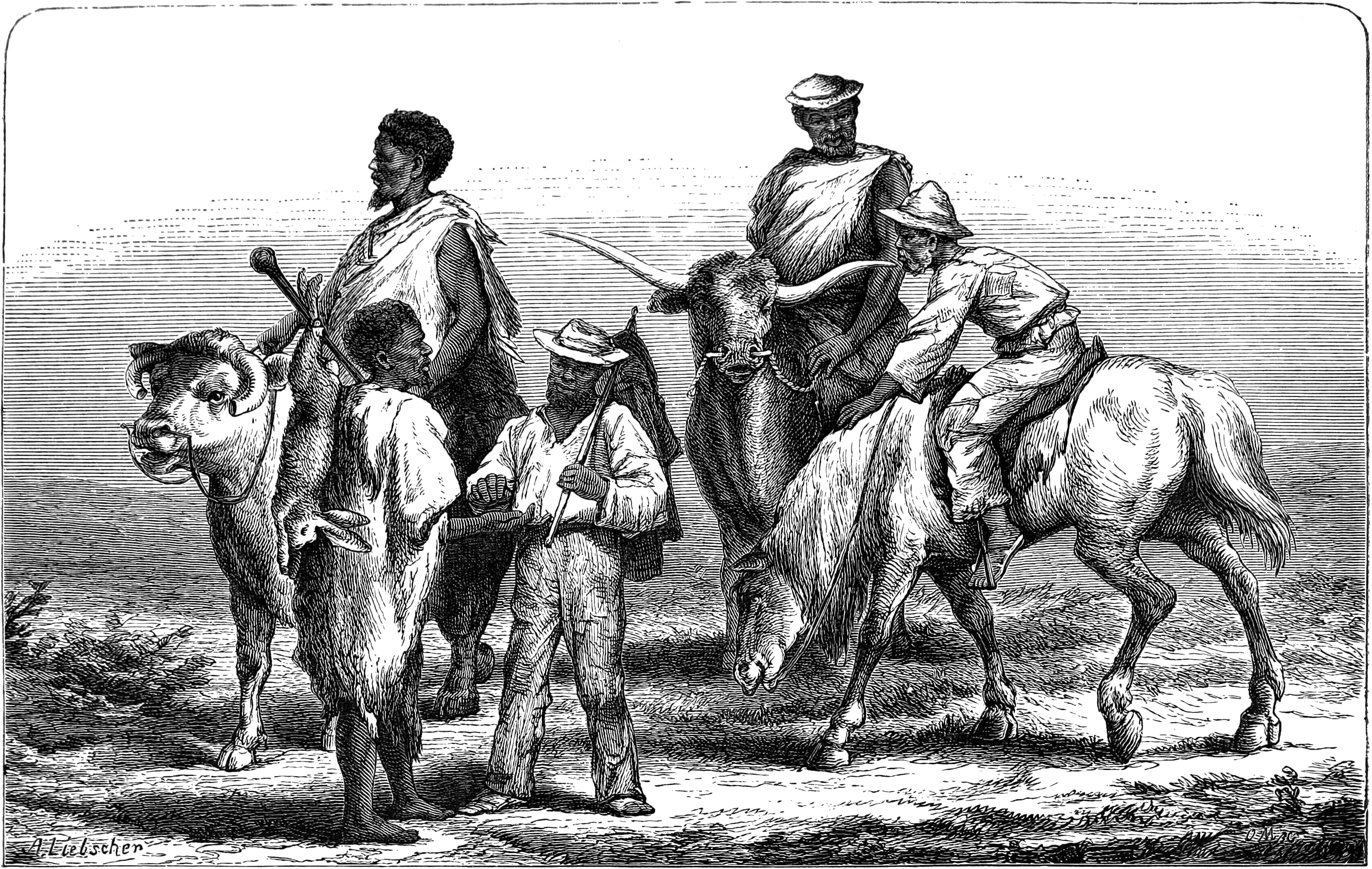
Batlhaping on a journey (1881)

Batlhaping is one of the Tswana clans which resides mostly in the Northern Cape and North West of South Africa. The name of the Batlhaping loosely translates to "those with an affinity for fish". After Barolong settled on the banks of the Vaal River known as Kolong, fish became a staple of their diet. During their migration, the Batlhaping encounted the Korana, a nomadic Khoekhoe tribe in 1750. The two tribes settled together. There were several harassing raids by the Ndebele which led to most Barolong to move Northwards to modern day Ganyesa. Those who were left behind stayed and fought back against the raids of the Ndebele and they were referred to from that point as "those who remained behind to eat fish", thus this became their name. This however did not mean that they were independent from Barolong. "Tlhapi" means "Fish", and this is not the tribe's totem. The tribe does have the symbol of the fish in usage under some circumstances to differentiate themselves from other Barolong, however since they are Barolong their totem or equivalent is a Kudu, which in Setswana is called Tholo. This is why Barolong affectionately refer to each other as "Tholo".

== History ==
The Batlhaping clan originates from a breakaway of the Barolong, a Tswana clan which dates back to 1270. Barolong derives their name from their first ruler Morolong, a name which means to forge in Tswana, suggesting one who was a practitioner in the craft of a blacksmith. The Barolong were already spread widely between the headwaters of the Molopo and the Modder Rivers by the time they were ruled by their eighth king Modiboa. The rule of the ninth Barolong king Tshesebe (c. 1565 – c. 1595) witnessed the emigration of a group of clans under the sub-king (kgosana) Phuduhutswana, and their southward trek to establish themselves at Dikgatlong near the confluence of the Vaal (Noka-eTshehla or Lekwa) and the Harts (Kolong) rivers. Reasons for this exodus are unclear, but these emigrant Barolong retained their links with the capital.

During the reign of the fourteenth Barolong king Tau, the Batlhaping refused to continue paying sehuba (tribute) to the Barolong monarch. They were thereby declaring themselves independent of the Barolong state. During their migration, the Batlhaping encounted the Korana, a nomadic Khoekhoe tribe in 1750. The two tribes settled together at Nakoneng and established trade relations. Intermarriage between the Batlhaping and the Korana was quite common.

The Batlhaping tribe continued the tradition of mining iron. They had not learned to make their own goods from iron or copper. By 1778, the Batlhaping were making annual trips to trade with Khoekhoe communities on the Orange River, bringing copper, iron, knives, axes and assegais as well as tanned skins, ivory spoons and glass beads. In exchange they received cattle. A member of the first European expedition in 1801 reported that the Batlhaping received the copper beads worn by the chief were from the Barolong. Other travellers highlighted that the copper beads and rings worn by Batlhaping originated from the Damara in Namibia or the Bangwaketsi tribe in the east. The Batlhaping started making iron goods themselves in 1812.

In 1835, a disagreement between Maidi and his father Tawana (leader of Barolong) resulted in Maidi leading a group of Barolong away and settling what is now known as Makwasie in the North West. Maidi's people then settled in Botswana before moving to Thaba-Nchu (where they lived side-by-side with Kgosi Moroka's people). After spending time in Thaba-Nchu, they settled in Potchefstroom before moving to Manthe. The group led by Maidi joined the Balthaping and became known as the Balthaping Ba-Ga-Maidi.

== Batlhaping nowadays ==
Nowadays, the Batlhaping people are found mostly in the Northern Cape and the North West of South Africa. Three of the most prominent groups from the tribe are Batlhaping Ba Ga Phudutswana, Batlhaping ba ga Mothibi and Balthaping Ba-Ga-Maidi. Batlhaping ba ga Phuduhutswana live mostly in Kuruman, Danileskuil, Kimberly and Vryburg in the Northern Cape, while most Batlhaping Ba-Ga-Maidi live in Taung in the North West.

== Notable Batlhaping ==
- Kgosi Galeshewe
- Luka Jantjie
- kgosi Modisakoma mahura
- Kgosi Victor Bogosing Mahura (Chief of Deerdwal, Northern Cape)
- Kgosi bogaleboile mahura
- Kgosi George Kgama Mothibi
- J M Lekgetho (published author of “Buswa jwa puo”)From Batlharos in Kuruman.

== See also ==
- Tswana people
- Toto Makgolokwe
- Langeberg Rebellion (1896–97)
