= Ihawu Field Engineer Regiment =

3 Field Engineer Regiment Ihawu Field Engineer Regiment
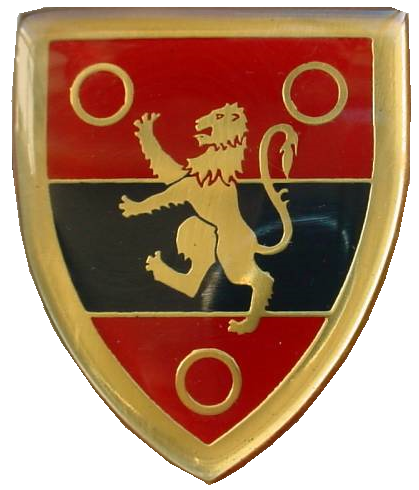
- 3 Field Engineer emblem
- Active: 1926 – present
- Country: South Africa
- Allegiance: Republic of South Africa; Republic of South Africa
- Branch: South African Army; South African Army
- Type: Military engineering
- Size: Regiment
- Part of: South African Army Engineer Formation; Army Conventional Reserve
- Garrison/HQ: Fort iKapa Military Base, Akasia, Cape Town
- Nickname: 3 Field
- Colors: Guardsman Red and Oxford Blue
- Engagements: South African Border War; Operation Savannah

Insignia
- Collar Badge: Bursting grenade with nine flames
- Beret Colour: Oxford blue
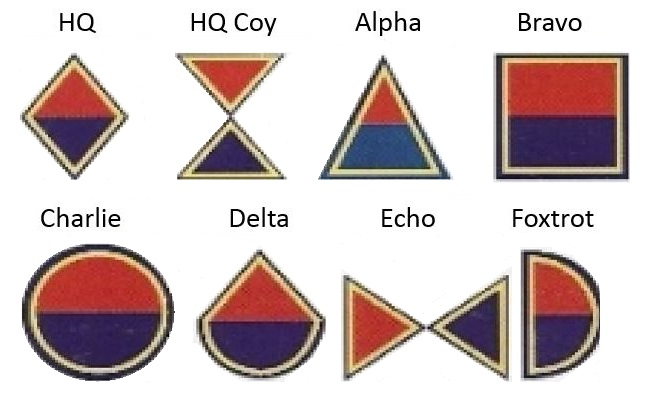
- Engineers Company Emblems

- Engineers Beret Bar circa 1992
- Abbreviation: IFER

The Ihawu Field Engineer Regiment (formerly 3 Field Engineer Regiment) is a reserve engineer regiment of the South African Army.

== History ==
=== Origin ===
3 Field Engineer Regiment was formed in 1926 as three engineer companies.

=== World War II ===
In 1940, 3 Field was mobilized for World War 2 and saw service in North Africa, where it participated in the desert campaign and the Battle of El Alamein. 3rd Field Company was attached to 1st S.A. Division and played an important part in the Division's first operation - the raid to capture El Wak - by ensuring water supplies. The Company served with distinction throughout the campaign in Ethiopia and Abyssinia. In one of the strangest of combined operations, No 1 Section was required to set bangalore torpedoes to blow up the outer and inner barbed wire entanglements protecting Fort Todenyang on the shore of Lake Rudolf.

By 1946 the unit was designated as 3 Field Squadron and along with 1 Field Squadron from Durban, 2 Field Squadron from Port Elizabeth and 8 Field Park Squadron from Cape Town, formed 2 Field Engineer Regiment.

=== Border War ===
By 1975, 3 Field was mobilised for service in South West Africa for Operation Savanah, and was in service until withdrawal in 1988.

=== Post 1994 ===
Since 1994 the regiment maintained a small footprint due to financial restrictions. 3 Field still participates in Exercise Bailey each year.

3 Field celebrated its 80th anniversary in 2006.

==== Name change ====
In August 2019, 52 Reserve Force units had their names changed to reflect the diverse military history of South Africa. 3 Field Engineer Regiment became the Ihawu Field Engineer Regiment, and have 3 years to design and implement new regimental insignia.

== Insignia ==
=== Previous insignia ===
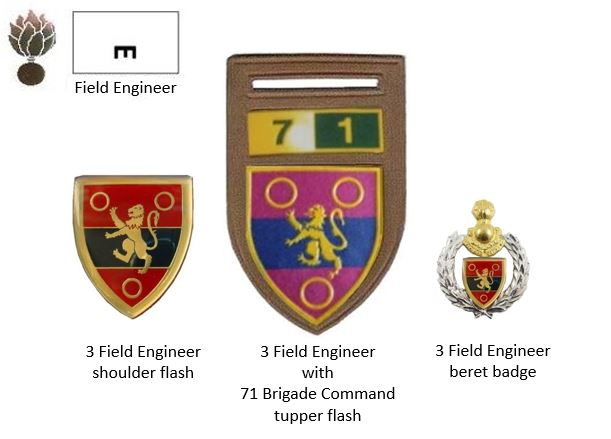
SADF era 3 Field Engineer Regiment insignia

== Leadership ==
3 Field Engineer Regiment Leadership
From	Honorary Colonels	To	Ribbon
n.d.	unknown	Present	
From	Commanding Officers	To	Ribbon
Jan 1983	Cmdt J.S. Manning	Jun 1984	
Jul 1984	Cmdt R.C. Cameron-Williger	Aug 1986	
Sep 1986	Cmdt K.H.W. Sheel	Jun 1991	
Jun 1991	Cmdt A.J. Nocton-Smith	Present	
From	Regimental Sergeants Major	To	Ribbon
n.d.	Unknown	n.d.	
