= Umkhonto Field Engineer Regiment =

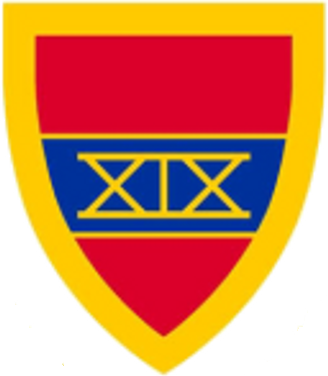
- SANDF 19 Field Engineers Emblem Regiment
- Active: 1970 -
- Country: South Africa
- Allegiance: Republic of South Africa; Republic of South Africa
- Branch: South African Army; South African Army
- Type: Military engineering
- Size: Battalion
- Part of: South African Army Engineer Formation; Army Conventional Reserve
- Garrison/HQ: Lord's Grounds, Durban 29°51′1.7454″S 31°1′22.08″E
- Nickname: 19 Field
- Mottos: First in, Last out
- Colors: Guardsman Red and Oxford Blue
- Engagements: South African Border War; Op Mistral (DRC); Op Cordite (Sudan); UN Force Intervention Brigade

Commanders
- Current commander: Lt Col N.A. Bushula

Insignia
- Collar Badge: Bursting grenade with nine flames
- Beret Colour: Oxford blue
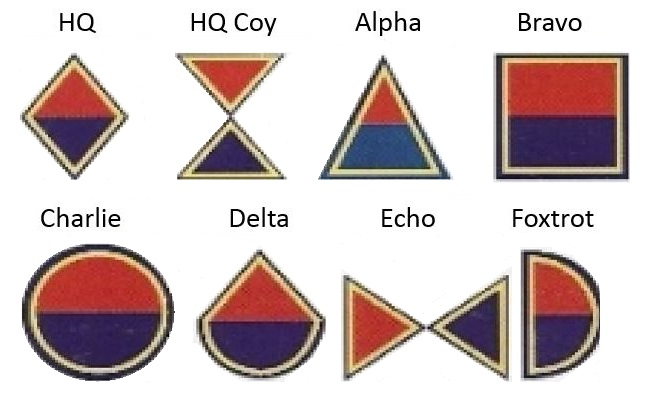
- Engineers Company Emblems

- Engineers Beret Bar circa 1992

The Umkhonto Field Engineer Regiment (formerly 19 Field Engineer Regiment) is a regiment of the South African Army Engineer Formation. The unit is based in Durban with the HQ being at Old Fort Military Base, Lord's Grounds. As a reserve unit, it has a status roughly equivalent to that of a British Army Reserve or United States Army National Guard unit.

The role of the Engineers is to maintain mobility and serviceability of own forces and counter mobility of enemy forces. Tasks include bridging, water purification, obstacles, demolition, infrastructure repair and development.

== History ==
=== Origin ===
19 Field Engineer Regiment was established as a Squadron in 1970 directly under Natal Command and was the first Engineer Squadron to be formed in Durban since the Second World War.

=== Border War ===
The squadron and later the Regiment was called up for a number of border duty camps during the 1970s and 1980s.

=== Post 1994 ===
During the 1994 election, the unit was called up and deployed in the Eshowe area under command of the Durban Light Infantry.

In 1995 and 1996 the unit participated in training camps in Lohatla.

With the formation of the 'type' formations, including the South African Army Engineer Formation (SAAEF), in 1999, the regiment shifted from the territorial command structure to that of the SAAEF.

During 2000 to 2005 a new strategy was put in place and for the first time the unit started to train its own recruited members in Basic Engineer Corps training and Junior Leader training.

One of the highlights during this time was the construction of a permanent 8 bay Single-Double Bailey bridge in the Manguzi area, near the Mozambique border to improve local security.

By 2006 the unit mandate changed. The first detachments of unit members were deployed to the Democratic Republic of Congo (DRC), as part of the United Nations (MONUC) and AU Peace Support operations. Up until October 2014, the Regiment has undertaken six deployments to the DRC.

The Regiment supplied one member to be part of the United Nations Force Intervention Brigade. Lt John Dovey RD deployed in the post of Combat Demolitions Team Leader as part of the Engineer troop attached to the 6 SAI Battalion.

The motto of the Engineer Corps is “Ubique” which means, Everywhere. The motto of the Regiment is First in, Last out.

== Insignia ==
The unit's insignia is based in the Roman numerals XIX (19) from its name.

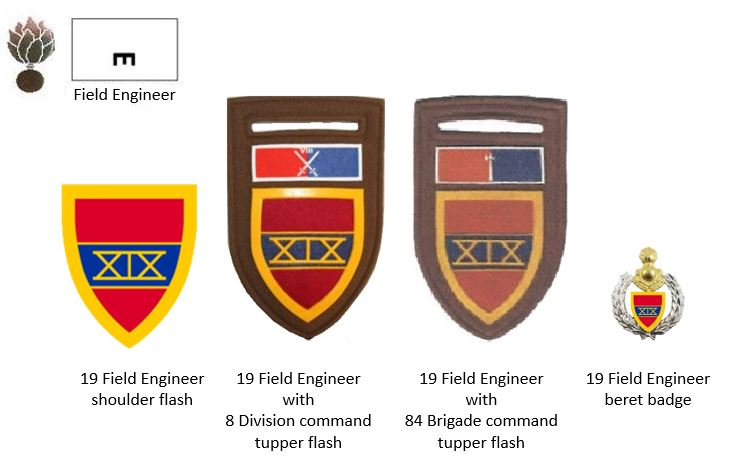
SADF era 19 Field Engineer Regiment insignia

== Leadership ==
19 Field Eng Regt Leadership
From	Honorary Colonels	To	Ribbon
1991	Col Derek I. Moe SM,MMM,JCD	Incumbent	Southern Cross Medal SM Military Merit Medal MMM John Chard Decoration JCD
From	Commanding Officers	To	Ribbon
1970	Maj G. Hogan	1974	
1975	Maj J. Eager	1978	
1979	Comdt H. Nurcombe-Thorne JCD	1988	John Chard Decoration JCD
1986	Capt Miles le Roux (Pro Tem)	1989	
1989	Lt Col Andre Potgieter JCD	1994	John Chard Decoration JCD
1994	Lt Col P.M. Summers	1996	
1996	Lt Col Peter E. Boulle MMM,RD	30 September 2001	Military Merit Medal MMM Medal Ribbon for Loyal Service - with RD device RD
1 October 2001	Lt Col "Tex" Westgate MMM,JCD	5 March 2007	Military Merit Medal MMM John Chard Decoration JCD
6 March 2007	Lt Col Brian Dore	November 2014	
November 2014	Lt Col N.A. Bushula	Incumbent	
From	Regimental Sergeants Major	To	Ribbon
1974	WO1 J. Elbourne	1976	
1977	WO1 M.S. Edwards JCD	1990	John Chard Decoration JCD
1990	WO1 M.S. Streeter SM,JCD	1998	Southern Cross Medal SM John Chard Decoration JCD
1998	MWO James "Jimmy" Alberts JCD	2014	John Chard Decoration JCD
2014	Staff Sgt N Sibiya (Acting)	Incumbent	
