= Langeberg Rebellion (1896–97) =

| Date | 1896–1897 |
| Location | Griqualand, Northern Cape, Cape Colony |
| Result | Rebellion suppressed |

Belligerents
| Batlhaping tribe Baltharo tribe | British settlers |

Commanders and leaders
| Luka Jantjie; Kgosi Galeshewe; Toto Makgolokwe | unknown |

The Langeberg Rebellion of 1896–97, also known as Ntwa ya Bana ba Mokgothu in SeTswana, was a war of resistance waged by two Tswana groups: the Batlhaping and the Batlharo, against British settlers in all of Griqualand area of the Northern Cape. The Rebellion was triggered when the baTswana groups became suspicious about the intentions of the Cape Colonial government as they feared, justifiably, that they stood to lose land and were being marginalised in the growing market economy of the Cape. The Langeberg Rebellion consisted of a series of revolts between December 1896 and August 1897 against British land annexations in the Griqualand area. The Rebellion was led by chiefs Kgosi Luka Jantjie and Kgosi Galeshewe of the Batlhaping and chief Toto Makgolokwe of the Batlharo.
