= Magogong =

Town in Northern Cape, South Africa

- Location within Northern Cape Location within South Africa
- Coordinates: 27.654°S 24.815°E
- Country: South Africa
- Province: North West
- District: Dr Ruth Segomotsi Mompati
- Municipality: Greater Taung

Area
  - Total: 12.94 km^{2} (5.00 sq mi)

Population (2011)
  - Total: 8,327
  - Density: 643.5/km^{2} (1,667/sq mi)

Racial makeup (2011)
  - Black African: 97.8%
  - Coloured: 1.7%
  - Indian/Asian: 0.1%
  - White: 0.1%
  - Other: 0.2%

First languages (2011)
  - Tswana: 88.9%
  - Xhosa: 3.9%
  - Afrikaans: 1.7%
  - S. Ndebele: 1.1%
  - Other: 4.4%
- Time zone: UTC+2 (SAST)
- Postal code (street): 8575
- PO box: 8575

Magogong is a rural village in Greater Taung Municipality in the North West Province of South Africa.
