= Reginald Prothero =

British naval officer (1849–1927)

Vice-Admiral Reginald Prothero CB MVO
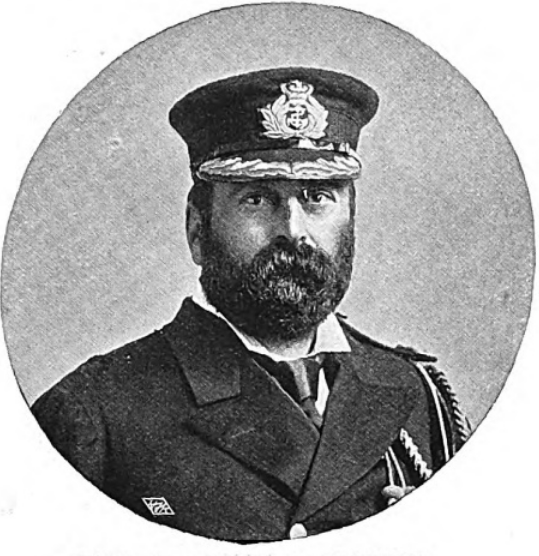
- Prothero as a captain, c.1899
- Born: 15 June 1849
- Died: 26 May 1927 (aged 77); Emsworth
- Military career
- Allegiance: United Kingdom
- Branch: Royal Navy
- Rank: Vice-admiral
- Nicknames: Prothero the Bad; Shylock; Old P
- Commands: HMS Revenge; HMS Doris; Naval Brigade, South Africa; HMS Pembroke; HMS Implacable
- Conflicts: Second Boer War; Battle of Belmont; Battle of Graspan (WIA)

Vice-Admiral Reginald Charles Prothero CB MVO (15 June 1849 – 26 May 1927), known as Prothero the Bad, was a Royal Navy officer and eccentric who served through the nineteenth and early twentieth centuries.

Having begun his naval career in 1862, Prothero participated in a circumnavigation of the globe and saw service in Britain and the Mediterranean Sea. By 1893 he was second-in-command of HMS Nile and was present at the sinking of HMS Victoria. Promoted to captain in 1895, Prothero commanded HMS Revenge in the Mediterranean and then HMS Doris on the Cape of Good Hope Station. There in 1899 the Second Boer War began, and Prothero led a naval brigade in support of the Relief of Kimberley. He was badly wounded at the Battle of Graspan and later appointed a Companion of the Order of the Bath for his war services.

Prothero's last command was HMS Implacable from 1902, again in the Mediterranean. He was appointed a Member of the Royal Victorian Order during Edward VII's visit to Malta in 1903, and retired as a captain in 1904. He was promoted to rear-admiral in 1906 and vice-admiral in 1910. Known as a fiery officer and strict disciplinarian of large stature, his eccentric nature made him well-known throughout the Royal Navy.

== Career ==
=== Early service ===
Reginald Charles Prothero was born on 15 June 1849, the son of Charles Prothero of Malpas Court, in Monmouthshire, Wales. He had a sister, Edith, who went on to marry Sir William Pitcairn Campbell.

Prothero joined the Royal Navy as a naval cadet in December 1862, and as a midshipman formed part of the flying squadron which circumnavigated the globe under the command of Rear-Admiral Geoffrey Hornby between 1869 and 1870. For Prothero this included representing the navy in cricket matches at the Cape of Good Hope, Tasmania, and Auckland. He was promoted to sub lieutenant on 22 July 1870 and then lieutenant on 8 August 1874. His early career included in 1881 serving on the gunboat HMS Magpie, troopship HMS Tyne, guard ship HMS Duke of Wellington, and then at the torpedo school HMS Vernon.

Prothero joined the turret ship HMS Devastation on 7 January 1889, before being promoted to commander on 30 June the same year. He was posted to the Mediterranean Sea to serve in the battleship HMS Edinburgh on 7 January 1890. Continuing in the Mediterranean, he moved to the turret ship HMS Neptune on 11 June 1891, and then on 30 June transferred to the battleship HMS Nile.

The naval historian Richard Hough describes Prothero as one of the eccentric cranks of the navy, alongside Lord Charles Beresford and Sir Algernon Heneage. One of Prothero's many peculiarities, addressing people as "boy", grew whilst he was with Nile; it eventually transcended rank to the point that when his admiral came on board while off Crete, Prothero greeted him with "Well boy, had a good day?".

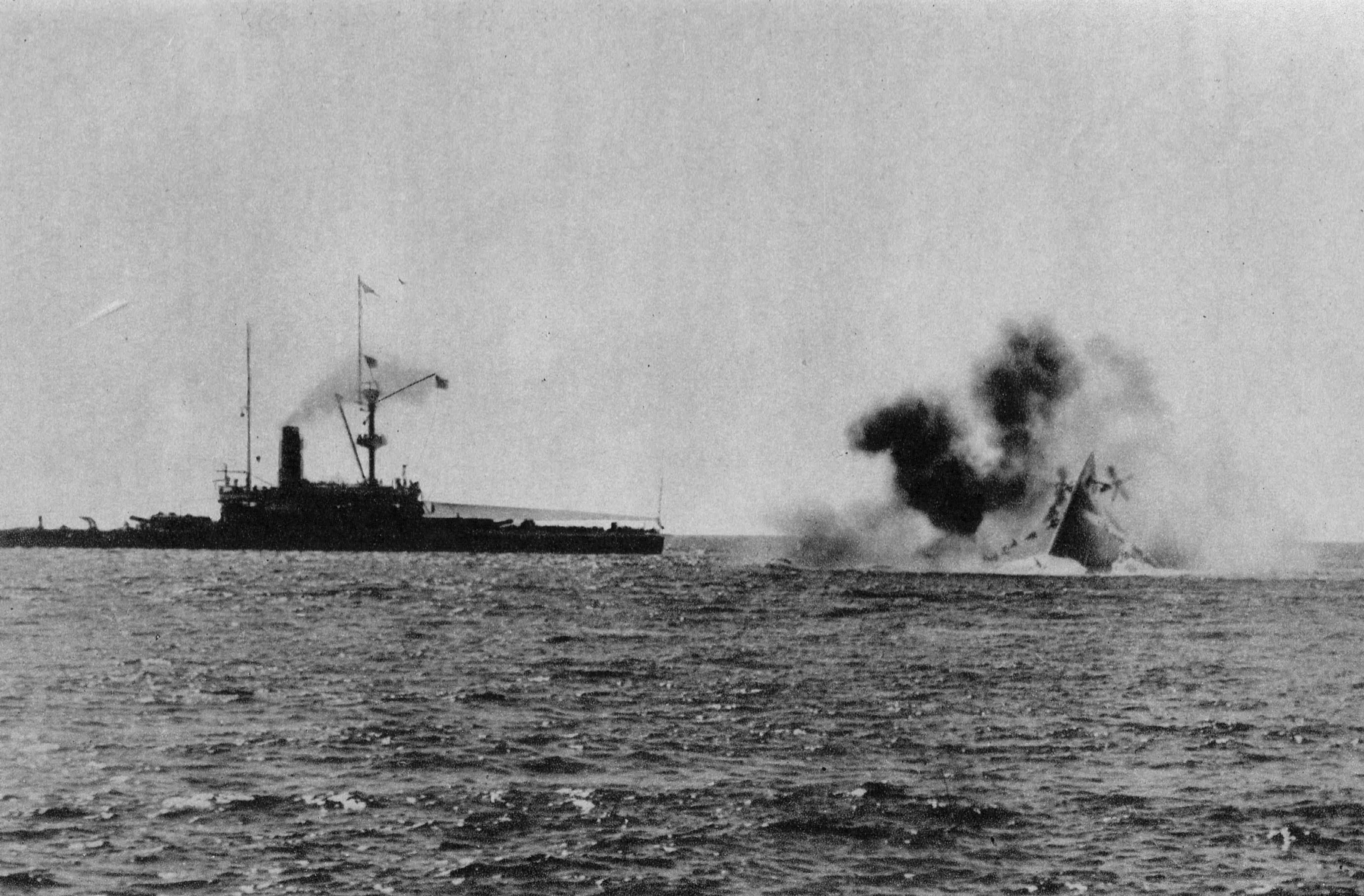
The sinking of HMS Victoria; Prothero's ship HMS Nile is on the left

Nile's captain was Gerard Noel. While the relationship between the two was generally cordial, they occasionally butted heads. In one instance Noel stopped Prothero from having the ship painted in order to practice going to general quarters. As part of this Noel, standing next to Prothero, announced that he had been killed and for Prothero to take over the mock battle. Prothero blithely responded "And a bloody good job too, boy, sound the secure — painting parties, fall in".

Nile was usually stationed directly behind the flagship of the fleet, Vice-Admiral Sir George Tryon's battleship HMS Victoria. On 22 June 1893 Nile was at her usual station during manoeuvres when Victoria collided with the battleship HMS Camperdown, sinking and killing 358 men. Close to the disaster, Nile assisted in rescuing survivors.

=== Command ===
==== Mediterranean ====
Prothero was promoted to captain on 1 June 1895. His first command was the battleship HMS Revenge in December 1896, serving as part of the International Squadron in the Mediterranean. Revenge was the flagship of Rear-Admiral Robert Hastings Harris, tasked with evacuating women from Crete to protect them from the Cretan Revolt. Many of the women were pregnant and, lacking medical staff, Prothero had his crew assist in dealing with the babies, resulting in competitions as to who had the cleanest baby. From November 1897 Prince Abhakara Kiartivongse of Siam served on Revenge as a midshipman, with Prothero assisting in his naval education. The Thai historian Aphidet Aphakon records how in this period Prothero terrorized his underlings, and was known for "talking with his fists".

Prothero was nicknamed "Prothero the Bad" throughout the Royal Navy, contrasting his fiery nature with that of his calmer naval cousin Arthur Prothero, "Prothero the Good". As a captain Prothero was described by one admiral of the fleet as "quite the most terrifying man I ever served with. Eyes like a hawk - most piercing eyes - and a great hooked nose over a bristling black beard...terrific shoulders, he was nearly as broad as he was long." This signature look also led to another of Prothero's nicknames, "Shylock".

==== South Africa ====
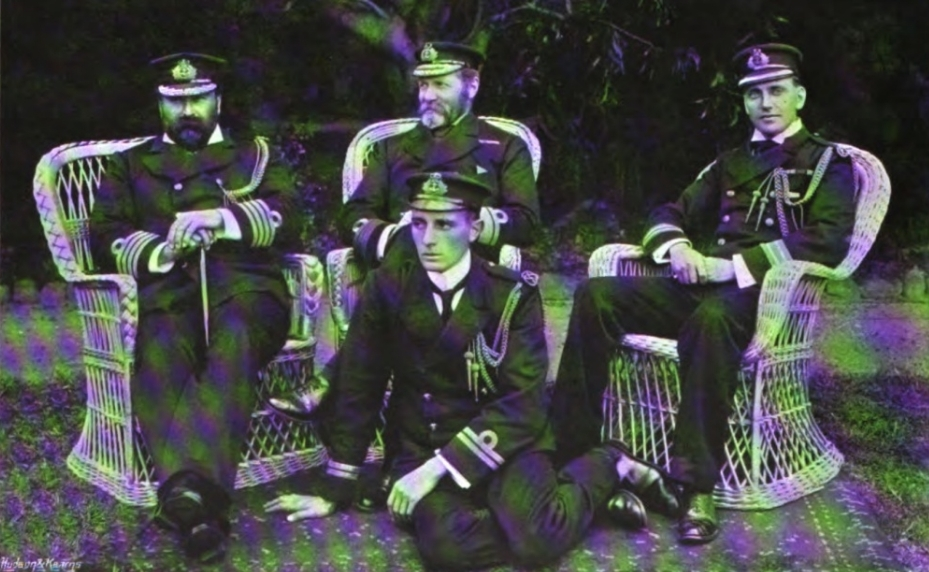
The staff at the Cape: Prothero is on the left, with Sir Robert Harris in the centre

Prothero was given command of the cruiser HMS Doris on 27 April 1898, serving on the Cape of Good Hope and West Africa Station with Harris again on board as commander-in-chief. Respected by the sailors crewing the ship for his fairness and judicial behaviour, Prothero nonetheless scared the midshipmen serving in his overcrowded gunroom. He would sometimes punish them for offences, such as getting in his way or annoying him, by grabbing them by the collar and throwing them off Doris' bridge on to the deck below. One of these officers, Midshipman Andrew Cunningham, regarded waking Prothero from an afternoon nap in February 1900 as "the single bravest act of his whole life".

Prothero would often mumble his orders to messenger midshipmen and, in fear of asking the captain what he had said, the midshipmen would move aside and whisper for Prothero's coxswain to translate for them. The historian James Morris agrees with this portrayal, calling Prothero "one of the most alarming persons ever to command a warship".

Still with Doris on station in May 1899, Prothero refused to allow his crew to use Doris' steam pinnace, instead testing them with exercises in the stormy False Bay using cutters, resulting in several being washed up at Simon's Town. An opponent of the use of engines, he would time his boat's crew as they rowed him ashore, making them row far out to sea if they did not meet his expectations.

The Second Boer War began on 11 October 1899. To assist in the combat on land in South Africa, a naval brigade of 400 hundred men from Doris, the protected cruiser HMS Powerful, and the turret ship HMS Monarch, was formed at Simon's Bay. Prothero was selected to command this force; they departed on 19 November to join the army commanded by Lieutenant-General Lord Methuen. Participating in the advance to relieve the besieged town of Kimberley, after providing artillery support at the Battle of Belmont on 23 November, the brigade was engaged at the Battle of Graspan on 25 November.

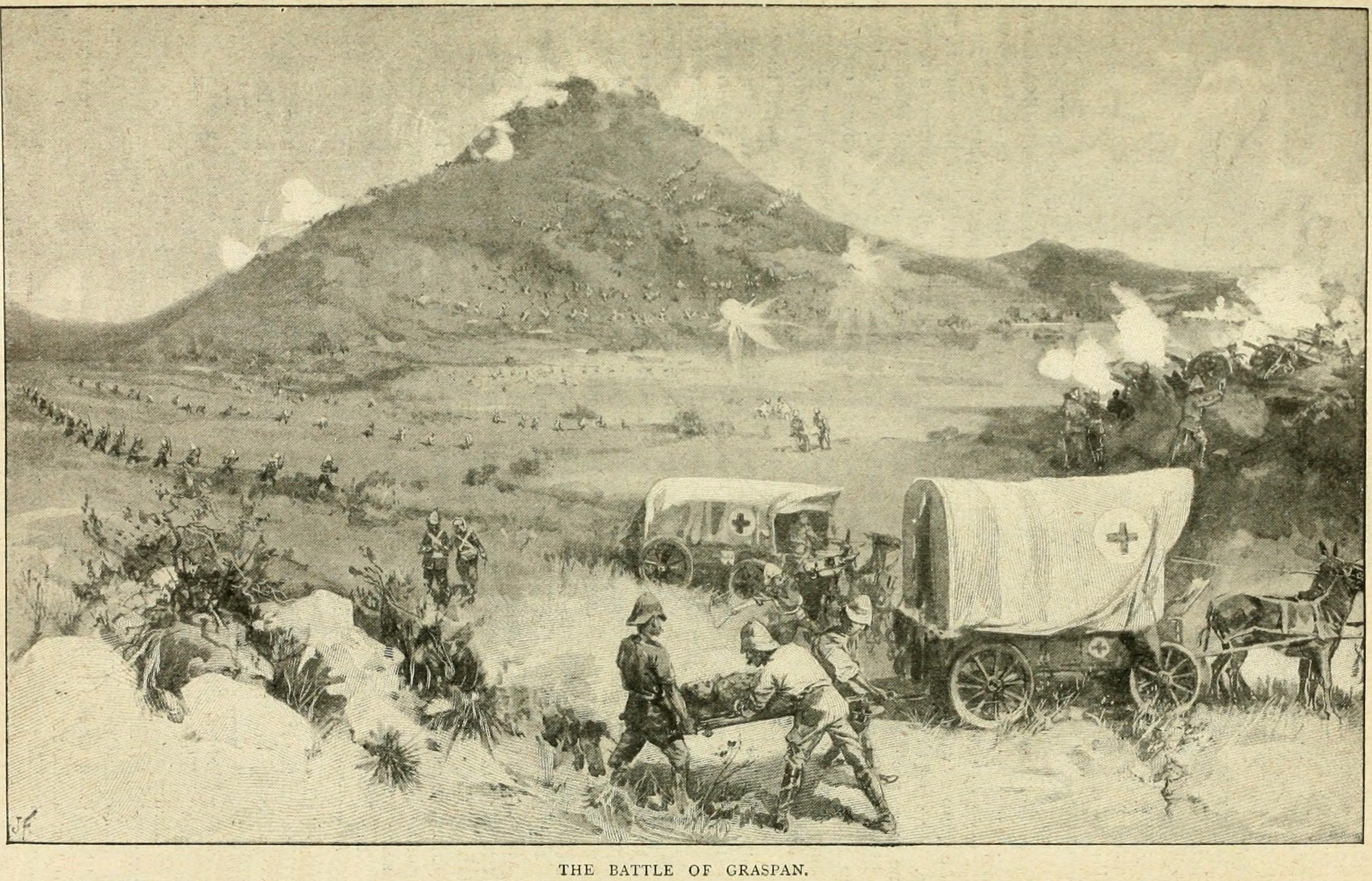
The advance up-hill of Prothero's brigade at the Battle of Graspan

Selected to lead the attack on the hilly Boer positions as infantry, the brigade attaacked at daylight. Advancing upward in one long line, they moved in waves, with one lying down while the next ran ahead of it. The Boers quickly caused heavy casualties amongst the British; Prothero led the force centrally, standing in front of his men leaning on a walking stick and refusing to lie down. Winton notes that "being almost as broad as he was tall, [he] made an excellent target", and in his own memoirs Prothero wrote that the Boer rifle fire was so intense that he saw men being hit three times before their bodies hit the ground.

During the advance Prothero was shot and fell with a torn main vein in his right arm; hobbling forwards again, he shouted "Men of the Naval Brigade, advance at the double; take that kopje and be hanged to it!". He was subsequently evacuated from the field and returned to Simon's Town for treatment. The Boer position was taken with a loss of fifteen killed and seventy-nine wounded in the brigade.

The Boer general Piet Cronjé surrendered to the British on 27 February 1900, and was imprisoned on board Doris for the duration. While at the Cape, Prothero led a court of inquiry for a seaman who had refused to complete a punishment. For this Prothero shockingly sentenced the man to be flogged, an archaic punishment long out of use but not abolished. For this he was attacked in the magazine Truth by Henry Labouchère. It was possibly the last use of this punishment within the Royal Navy. For his services in South Africa Prothero was appointed a Companion of the Order of the Bath on 6 November 1900.

==== Mediterranean return ====
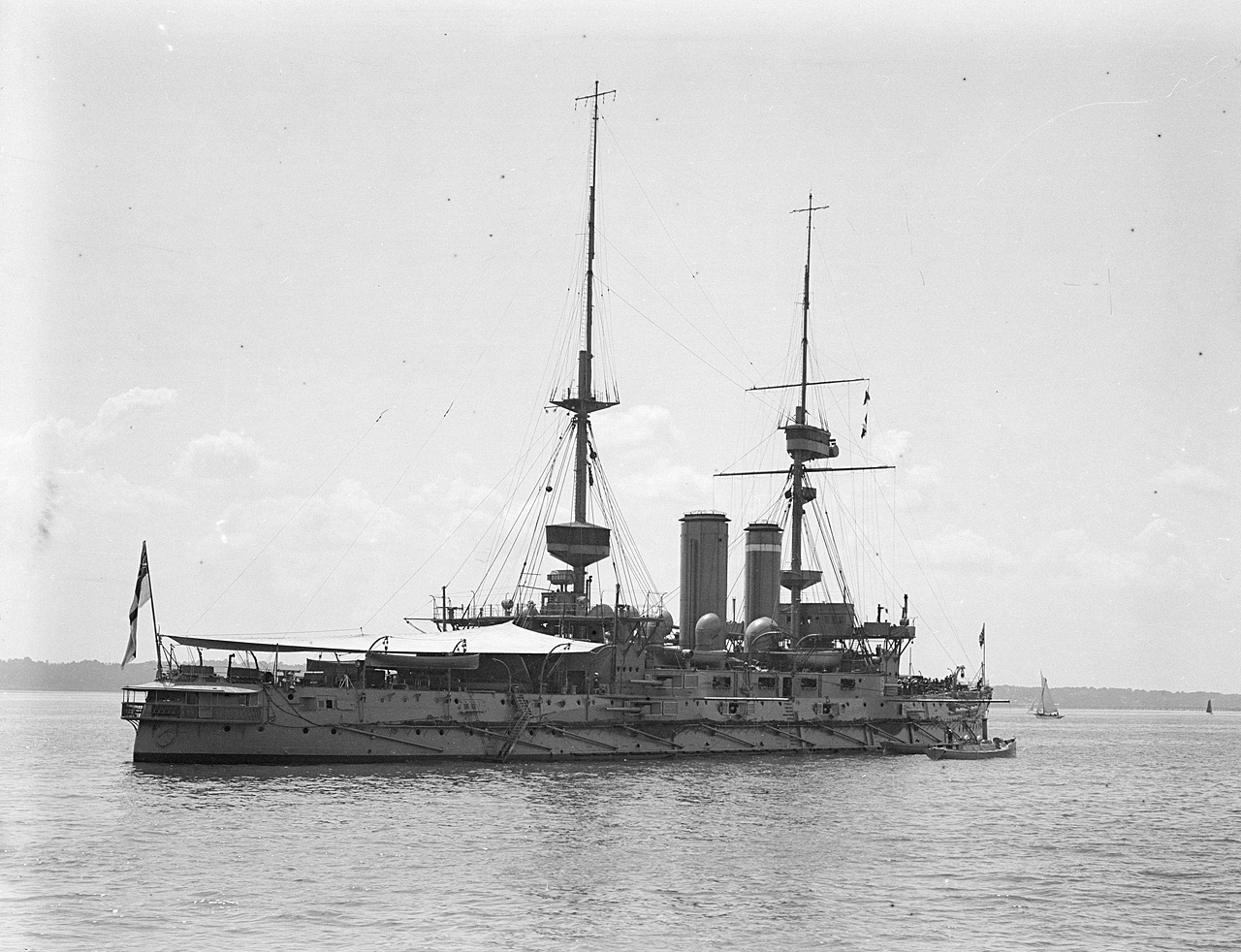
HMS Implacable, Prothero's last command

Having returned from South Africa, Prothero was given command of the Medway Reserves at Chatham Dockyard from the hulk HMS Pembroke in June 1901. He was then given command of the battleship HMS Implacable in the Mediterranean in October 1902. According to Winton, Prothero was "old and more crotchety and eccentric than ever...attempting to impose his own draconian regime and rigid discipline".

On one occasion at Malta Implacable was in harbour having some work done on her engines, which had been removed and dismantled. A mistake was made and the staff ordered Implacable to be ready to sail on the next day. Specifically the command said to raise steam, and as the boilers were still in place, Prothero complied. The next morning he signalled "Submit Implacable has steam for twelve knots but engines are on shore in the dockyard". In April 1903 Edward VII visited Malta. Prothero, present for this, was appointed a Member of the Royal Victorian Order on 27 April. He relinquished command of Implacable in May 1904.

=== Flag rank ===
Prothero was placed on the retired list of naval officers, due to his age, on 15 June 1904, still a captain. He continued to be promoted, becoming a rear-admiral on 20 February 1906 and a vice-admiral on 22 July 1910. He began to deteriorate in old age; one officer who encountered him outside his club described "his clothes were worn and frayed, and the old ferocity gone". He died at Emsworth on 26 May 1927. Buried in London, his grave has the epitaph "It is not the length of life that counts but what is achieved during existence".

== Personal life ==
Prothero married Nellie Rose Harris at St Pancras New Church on 2 January 1893. He separated from her in 1909 because of an issue with her drinking, and in 1914 they divorced on the grounds of her adultery with another man. He then married Bertha White, a nurse who he met while she was treating his sister Edith. They had four children:

- Petty Officer Reginald Eric Prothero (1916–1940); Royal Navy, killed when HMS Cape Howe was torpedoed
- Marjorie Penzie Prothero (1917–1999); served in Queen Alexandra's Royal Naval Nursing Service
- Ivor John Prothero (1922–2018)
- Evelyn Bertha Prothero (1925–2018)

When Prothero died, Bertha found that she was not entitled to his naval pension because she was his second wife. The Royal Navy instead took Ivor and Evelyn in as orphans, sending them to Lord Wandsworth College. The education of Reginald and Marjorie was also sorted in this fashion, with the former at TS Mercury and the latter at the Royal Naval School.
