= Battle of Graspan =

Battle during the Second Boer War on November 25, 1899

Coordinates: 29°17′51.1″S 24°29′43.1″E

- Part of the Second Boer War
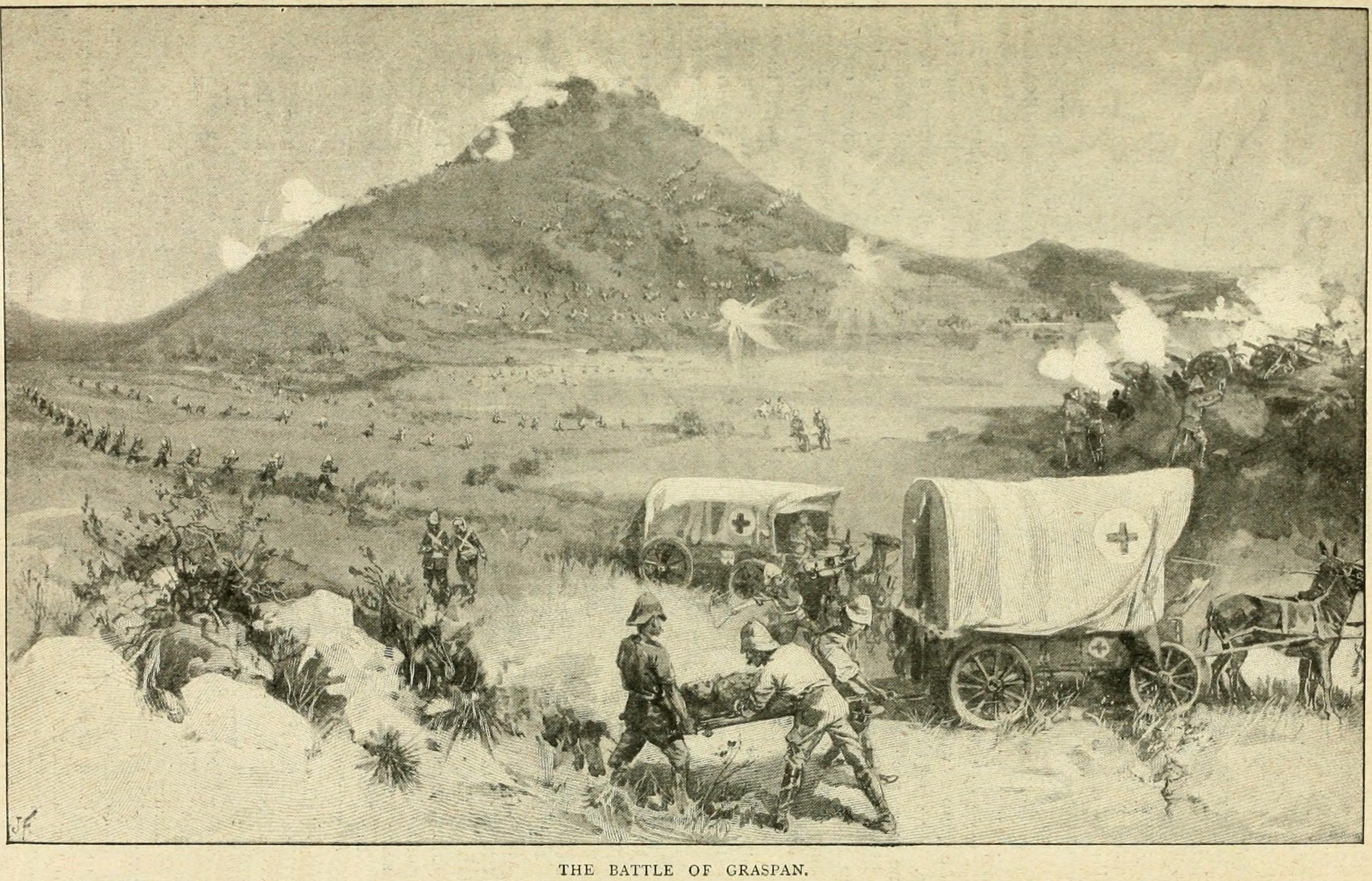
- The Battle of Graspan as seen from the railway station
| Date | 25 November 1899 |
| Location | Near Enslin, Orange Free State |
| Result | British victory |

Belligerents
| United Kingdom | South African Republic; Orange Free State |

Commanders and leaders
| (United Kingdom) Lord Methuen | (South African Republic) Koos de la Rey |

Strength
| 8,000; 16 field guns | 2,000; 5 field guns |

Casualties and losses
| 20 killed 165 wounded | ~200 killed |

The Battle of Graspan, also known as the Battle of Enslin, was an engagement in the Second Boer War near the Enslin railway station at Graspan kopje. The battle took place on November 25, 1899, between British forces led by Lord Methuen and Boers led by Koos de la Rey.

After the Battle of Belmont, Lord Methuen's force advanced up the railway in armored trains. On November 24, the train was shelled by Boer artillery in the nearby hills, derailing it. Methuen then decided to engage the Boers to continue his advance, with a subsequent assault on the next day.

== Battle ==
In the morning of November 25, the 9th Brigade headed north towards Graspan kopje. A Boer pom-pom fired on the British advances, along with four 75mm Krupp guns. The artillery fire killed 5 British regulars and two horses, in response the British fired their 12-inch naval guns, quickly silencing the Boers. After the artillery engagement, Methuen heliographed the Coldstreams, Scots, and Grenadiers to advance from Belmont to Graspan.

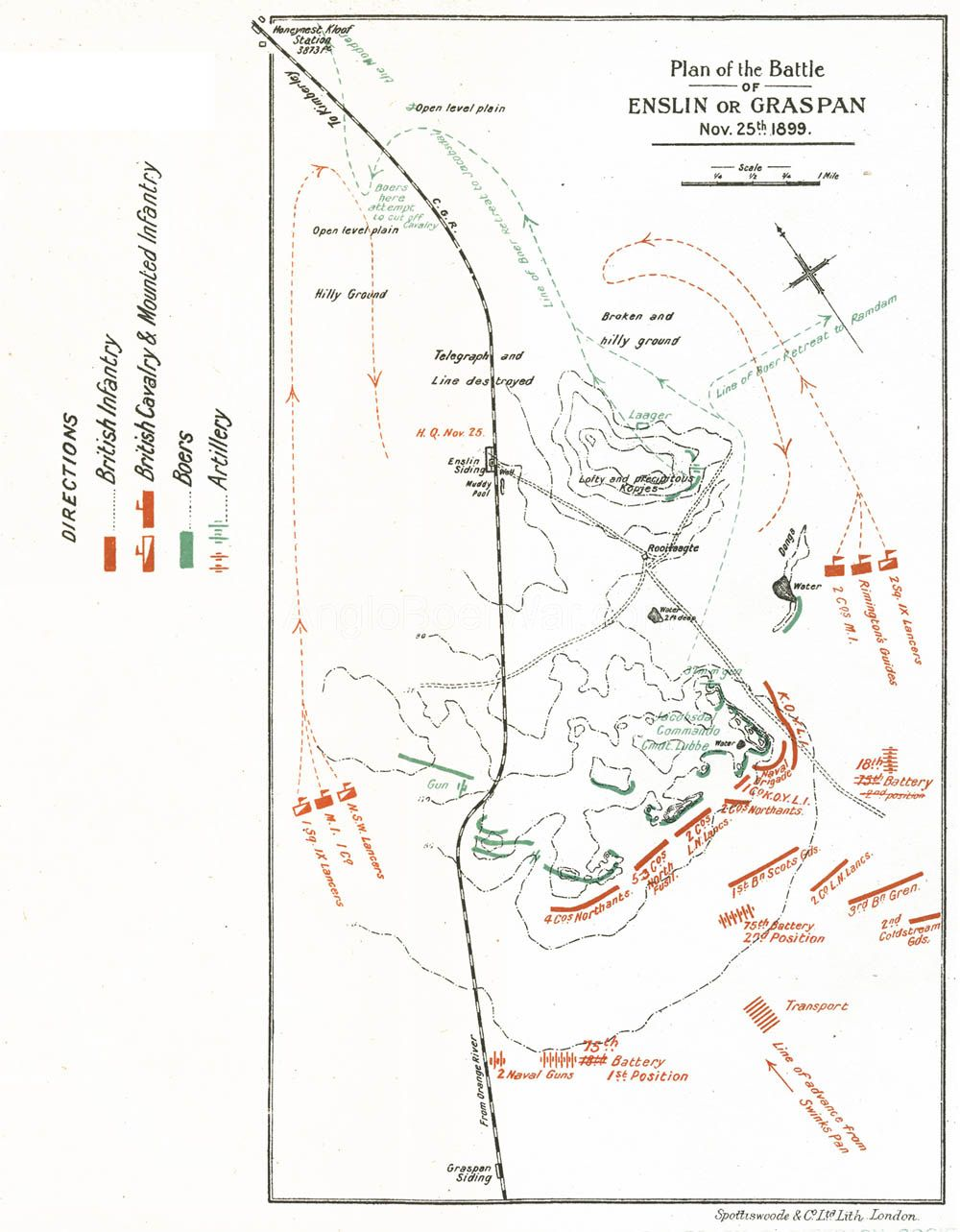
Map of the battle

At around 7 am, the Guards Brigade, along with the Northamptonshires and Northumberland Fusiliers, advanced up the railway towards the kopje. A Naval brigade consisting of sailors from the HMS Doris, HMS Terrible, HMS Powerful, as well as a battalion of Royal Marines, was present.

As the battle began, the Guards Brigade was held in reserve towards the rear, as they were heavily engaged at the Battle of Belmont just two days earlier. The fusiliers and light infantry regiments were brought up and sent to attack the Boer Positions.

The Naval brigade advanced towards the Boer positions, exposed. Unlike their army counterparts, these troops were not accustomed to the method of fighting that the regular infantry had faced. As such, the Naval brigade suffered many casualties due to their inexperience.

As they advanced towards the Boer positions, the British opened fire on the Boer positions under the cover of the grass and rocks. Dashing advances were made by the British until they reached the hill. Boer rifle fire managed to pick off some of the British, but were unable to halt the advance. The Guards eventually reached the base of the hill, and charged the Boer positions. Some Boers, upon seeing the British charges, retreated from the hill. Others stayed behind, holding off the British as long as possible. Eventually the British had encircled the position and had successfully infiltrated into the trenches, causing them to retreat to Modder River.

== Order of battle ==
=== British Forces ===
| 1st Division | Lieutenant-General Lord Paul Sanford Methuen GCB, GCMG, GCVO |
Division Troops
| 9th Lancers | Naval brigade: Captain Reginald Charles Prothero |
| 18th Field Battery, Royal Artillery | Sailors brigade from HMS Doris |
| 7th Field Company, Royal Engineers | Sailors brigade from HMS Terrible |
| Ammunition Column | Sailors brigade from HMS Powerful |
| 75th Field Battery, Royal Artillery | Royal Marines |
| Army Service Corps | |
Infantry Brigades
| 1st (Guards) Brigade: Major-General Henry Edward Coleville | 9th Brigade: Major-General Charles Whittingham Douglas |
| 3rd Battalion, Grenadier Guards | 1st Battalion Northumberland Fusiliers |
| 1st Battalion, Coldstream Guards | 1st Battalion Loyal North Lancashire Regiment |
| 2nd Battalion, Coldstream Guards | 2nd Battalion Northamptonshire Regiment |
| 1st Battalion, Scots Guards | 2nd Battalion King's Own Yorkshire Light Infantry |
| No 18 Bearer Company | 2nd Manchester Regiment |
| No 19 Company Army Service Corps | 1st Royal Munster Fusiliers |
| | New South Wales Lancers |

=== Boer Forces ===
Commandos under command of General Koos de la Rey
Jacobsdal Commando (1500)
Transvaal State Artillery section. (4x 7.5 cm Krupp Gun and 2x QF 1 pounder pom-pom guns)

== Aftermath ==
After the battle, Lord Methuen's force continued advancing up the railway towards Kimberley. Eventually on November 28, his forces would engage with a much larger Boer army at the Battle of Modder River. Methuen would win, but take many casualties. Metheun's advance would be halted, however, after the disastrous defeat at the Battle of Magersfontein. A memorial would be constructed in 1903, and dedicated to the Royal Marines, named after this battle.
