= HMS Implacable (1899) =

Pre-dreadnought battleship of the British Royal Navy

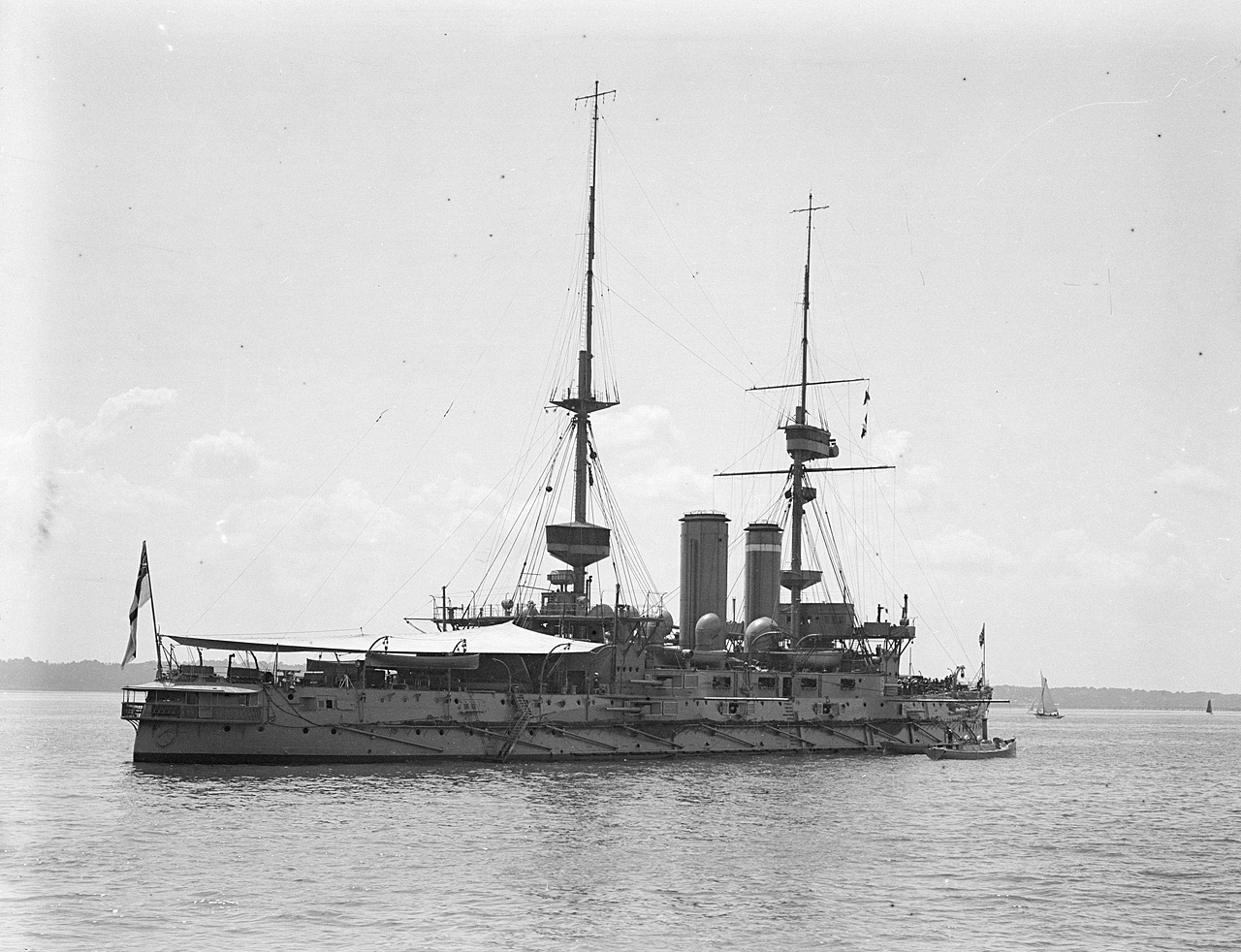
- HMS Implacable after the addition of fire control platforms to her foremast and mainmast.

History

United Kingdom
- Name: HMS Implacable
- Builder: Devonport Dockyard
- Laid down: 13 July 1898
- Launched: 11 March 1899
- Completed: July 1901
- Commissioned: 10 September 1901
- Decommissioned: 1919
- Fate: Broken up, 8 November 1921

General characteristics
- Class & type: Formidable-class battleship
- Displacement: Normal: 14,500 long tons (14,700 t); Full load: 15,800 long tons (16,100 t)
- Length: 431 ft 9 in (131.6 m) o/a
- Beam: 75 ft (22.9 m)
- Draught: 25 ft 11 in (7.90 m)
- Installed power: 20 × water-tube boilers; 15,000 ihp (11,000 kW)
- Propulsion: 2 × triple-expansion steam engines; 2 × screw propellers
- Speed: 18 knots (33 km/h; 21 mph)
- Range: 5,500 nmi (10,190 km; 6,330 mi) at 10 knots (19 km/h; 12 mph)
- Complement: 780
- Armament: 4 × BL 12-inch (305-mm) Mk IX guns; 12 × BL 6 in (152 mm) Mk VII guns; 10 × QF 12-pounder guns; 6 × QF 3-pounder guns; 4 × 18 in (457 mm) submerged torpedo tubes
- Armour: Belt: 9 in (229 mm); Bulkheads: 9–12 in (229–305 mm); Barbettes: 12 in (305 mm); Turrets: 10 in (254 mm); Casemates: 6 in (152 mm); Conning tower: 14 in (356 mm); Deck: 1–3 in (25–76 mm)

HMS Implacable was a Formidable-class battleship of the British Royal Navy, the second ship of the name. The Formidable-class ships were developments of earlier British battleships, featuring the same battery of four 12-inch (305 mm) guns—albeit more powerful 40-calibre versions—and top speed of 19 knots (35 km/h; 22 mph) of the preceding Canopus class, while adopting heavier armour protection. The ship was laid down in July 1898, was launched in March 1899, and was completed in July 1901. Commissioned in September 1901, she was assigned to the Mediterranean Fleet and served with the fleet until 1908. After a refit, she transferred to the Channel Fleet, then onto the Atlantic Fleet in May 1909. By now rendered obsolete by the emergence of the dreadnought class ships, she was assigned to the 5th Battle Squadron and attached to the Home Fleet in 1912.

Upon the outbreak of the First World War, Implacable, along with the squadron was assigned to the Channel Fleet. After operations with the Dover Patrol, she served in the Dardanelles Campaign in support of the Allied landings at Gallipoli. She participated in the Landing at Cape Helles on 25–26 April and supported ANZAC forces ashore over the course of the following month. In late May 1915, she was withdrawn to reinforce the Italian fleet at the southern end of the Adriatic Sea after Italy joined the war on the side of the Allies. She remained in the Mediterranean until June 1917, apart from a brief return to Britain in March and April 1916 for a refit. After returning to England, she was laid up until March 1918, when she was converted for use as a depot ship for the Northern Patrol. After the war, she was decommissioned and eventually sold for scrap in 1921.

== Design ==
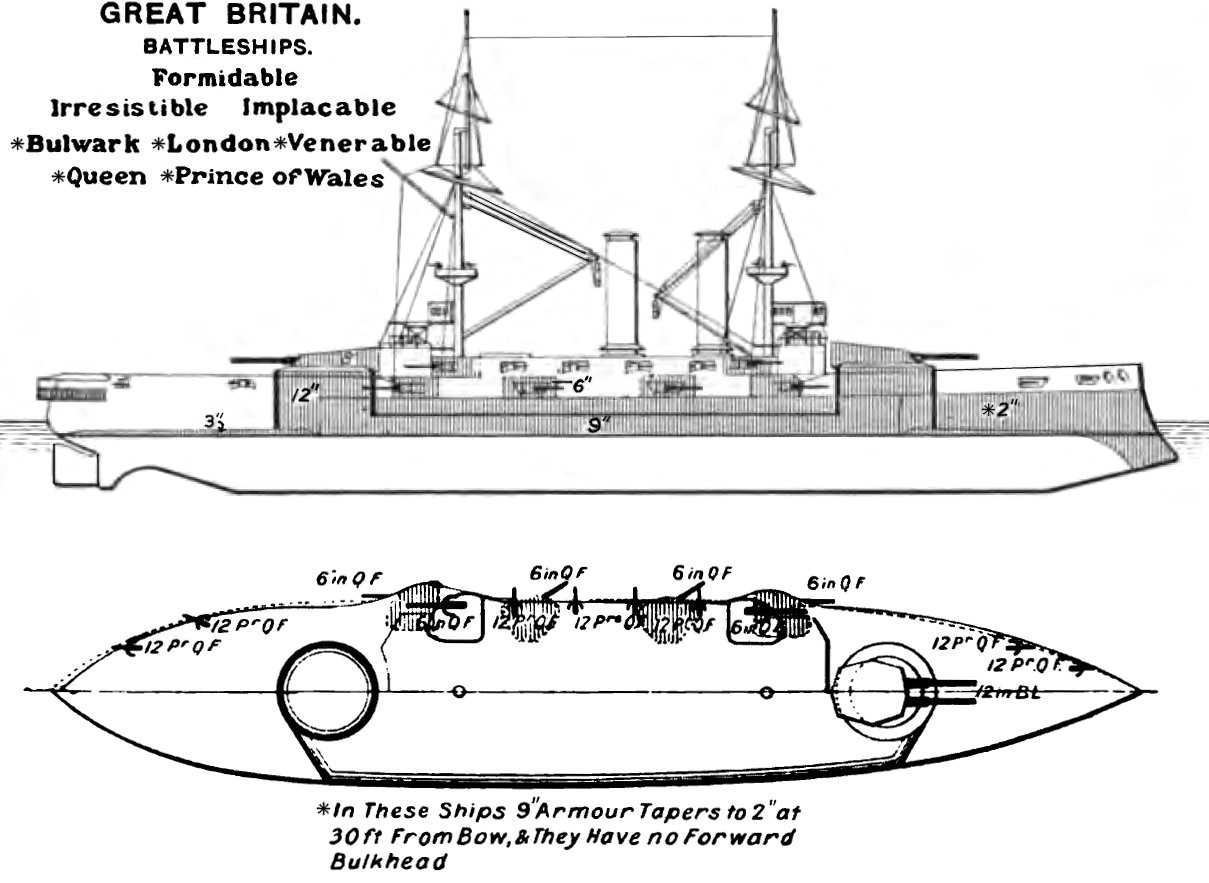
Line-drawing of the Formidable class

The design for the Formidable class was prepared in 1897; it was an incremental improvement over the preceding Majestic and Canopus classes. Formidable adopted the larger size of the Majestics, while taking the stronger Krupp armour of the Canopus design. In addition, the new design incorporated longer (and thus more powerful) main and secondary guns and an improved hull form. These characteristics produced a ship with better armour protection than either earlier class, but with the same high speed of Canopus.

Implacable was 431 feet 9 inches (131.60 m) long overall, with a beam of 75 ft (22.9 m) and a draught of 25 ft 11 in (7.90 m). She displaced 14,500 long tons (14,700 t) normally and up to 15,800 long tons (16,100 t) fully loaded. Her crew numbered 780 officers and ratings. The Formidable-class ships were powered by a pair of 3-cylinder triple-expansion engines that drove two screws, with steam provided by twenty Belleville boilers. The boilers were trunked into two funnels located amidships. The Formidable-class ships had a top speed of 18 knots (33 km/h; 21 mph) from 15,000 indicated horsepower (11,000 kW).

Implacable had a main battery of four 12-inch (305 mm) 40-calibre guns mounted in twin-gun turrets fore and aft; these guns were mounted in circular barbettes that allowed all-around loading or elevation. The ships also mounted a secondary battery of twelve 6-inch (152 mm) 45-calibre guns mounted in casemates, in addition to ten 12-pounder guns and six 3-pounder guns for defence against torpedo boats. As was customary for battleships of the period, she was also equipped with four 18-inch (457 mm) torpedo tubes submerged in the hull.

Implacable had an armoured belt that was 9 inches (229 mm) thick; the transverse bulkheads on either end of the belt were 9 to 12 in (229 to 305 mm) thick. Her main battery turrets sides were 8 to 10 in (203 to 254 mm) thick, atop 12 in (305 mm) barbettes, and the casemate battery was protected with 6 in of Krupp steel. Her conning tower had 14 in (356 mm) thick sides as well. She was fitted with two armoured decks, 1 and 3 in (25 and 76 mm) thick, respectively.

== Service history ==
=== Pre-First World War ===
HMS Implacable was laid down at Devonport Dockyard on 13 July 1898 and launched on 11 March 1899 in a very incomplete state to clear the building way for construction of battleship HMS Bulwark. She was completed in July 1901. Implacable was commissioned at Devonport Dockyard by Captain Prince Louis of Battenberg on 10 September 1901 for service on the Mediterranean Station, and left Plymouth for the Mediterranean 29 September, arriving at Malta on 8 October 1901. The gun shields for her 3-pounder guns were removed the following year. In June 1902 she was in Alexandria for the scheduled coronation festivities for King Edward VII, and in September that year she visited Nauplia in the Aegean Sea for combined manoeuvres with the Mediterranean and Channel squadrons. Captain Reginald Charles Prothero was appointed in command on 27 October 1902, serving as such until May 1904. In November 1902 she was Genoa to land Prince Louis on his departure home, and the officers of the ship attended the deferred coronation ball organized by the British colony in the city.

During her Mediterranean service, she underwent refits at Malta in 1902, 1903–1904, and 1904–1905. During these refits, she had her masts revised several times as rangefinders and fire control equipment were added. She suffered a fatal accident on 12 July 1905 when a boiler explosion killed or injured nine men. She suffered another boiler explosion on 16 August 1906, the result of a loss of feedwater that caused the boiler to overheat. She entered Chatham Dockyard in the United Kingdom in 1908 for another refit. During this refit, her 12-pounder guns were relocated from the main deck to the superstructure, and the four forward gun ports were plated over to reduce flooding in heavy seas. When her Chatham refit ended in February 1909, Implacable transferred to the Channel Fleet, then to the Atlantic Fleet on 15 May 1909. Following a fleet reorganisation on 1 May 1912, Implacable transferred to the 5th Battle Squadron in the Second Home Fleet at the Nore on 13 May 1912.

=== First World War ===
When First World War began in August 1914, the 5th Battle Squadron was assigned to the Channel Fleet and based at Portland. Implacable and her half-sister Queen were attached temporarily to the Dover Patrol in late October 1914 to bombard German Army forces along the coast of Belgium in support of Allied forces fighting at the front. The German forces were attacking French positions to the east of Dunkirk, and they were in dire need of heavy artillery support. A flotilla of destroyers and monitors helped to break up the attack before Implacable and Queen arrived, but reports of an imminent German counterattack with armoured cruisers, which ultimately failed to materialize, led the British to send the battleships to guard against it in company with the Harwich Force. When it had become clear that the German fleet posed no threat, they returned to the Channel Fleet. On 14 November 1914, the 5th Battle Squadron was transferred to Sheerness in case of a possible German invasion attempt, but it returned to Portland on 30 December 1914. In January 1915, the British and French navies began to draw ships to the eastern Mediterranean to begin operations against the Ottoman Empire, including several ships from the 5th Battle Squadron. By the end of the month, only Implacable, Queen, and their sisters Prince of Wales and London, along with the light cruisers Topaze and Diamond that had been assigned to support the 5th Squadron, were still at Portland.

==== Dardanelles campaign ====
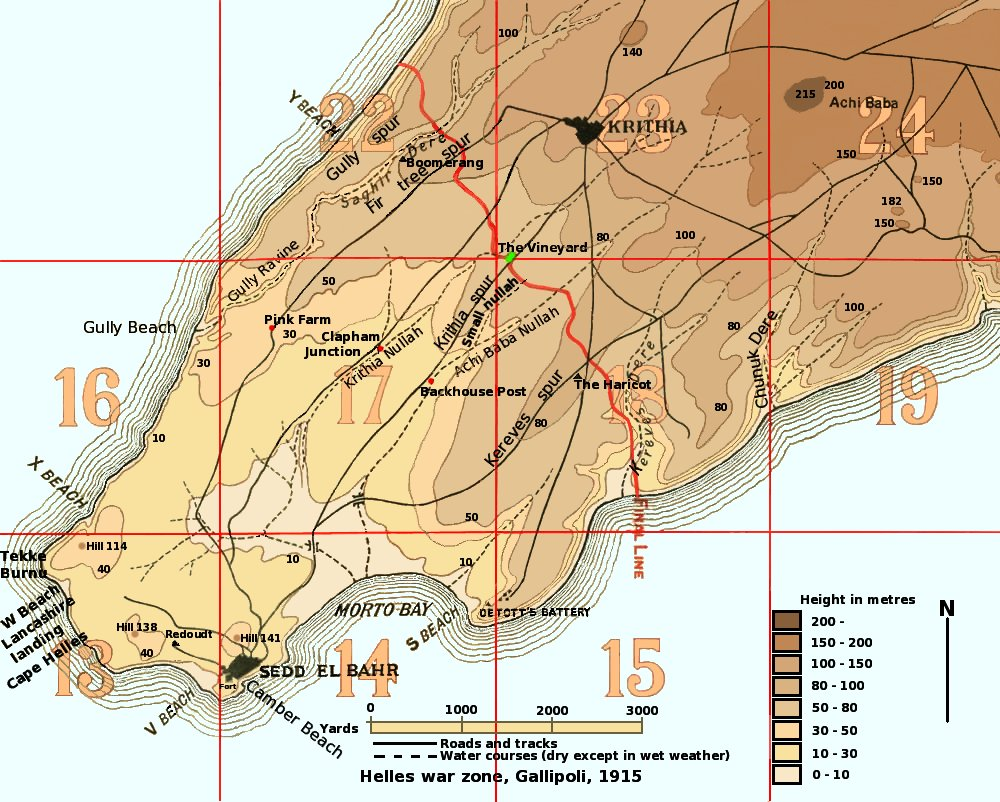
Map showing landing beaches of the Gallipoli Campaign

In March 1915, as the British and French fleets waging the Dardanelles campaign were preparing to launch a major attack on 18 March, the overall commander, Admiral Sackville Carden, requested two more battleships of the 5th Squadron, Implacable and Queen, to be transferred to his command in the expectation of losses in the coming operation. The Admiralty ordered the two ships to transfer to the Dardanelles, and they left England on 13 March 1915 and arrived at Lemnos on 23 March 1915. By the time they arrived, the British had lost two battleships in the 18 March attack, prompting the Admiralty to send the last two ships of the 5th Squadron to join the fleet. On her arrival off the Dardanelles, Implacable joined 1st Squadron, which included seven other battleships under the command of Rear Admiral Rosslyn Wemyss. Over the course of the next month, the British and French fleet began preparations for the landings at Cape Helles and at Anzac Cove, the beginning of the land portion of the Gallipoli Campaign.

Late in the day on 23 April, the Allied forces began to move into position for the landing; troop transports made their way to the concentration point off Tenedos. Wemyss followed in the armoured cruiser Euryalus, and Implacable and the battleship Cornwallis accompanied him. On the night of 24–25 April, soldiers transferred from the troopships to Implacable, Cornwallis, and Euryalus, which then steamed to their landing beaches under cover of darkness. Implacable arrived off X Beach, part of the landings at Cape Helles, and started sending men ashore at 04:00 under cover of her own bombardment of Ottoman defences. In the course of the bombardment, she fired twenty 12-inch shells and 368 rounds of 6-inch. In recognition of the critical support she had provided the troops as they attacked Ottoman positions, they named the landing site "Implacable Beach".

Over the course of the following days, Implacable continued to bombard Ottoman positions around the landing beaches. As Ottoman forces began to gather at Krithia to launch a counterattack against Y Beach on 26 April, Implacable opened a heavy bombardment that completely dispersed the Ottomans. Two days later, she was again off X Beach, and she and several other British and French battleships bombarded Ottoman troop concentrations during the First Battle of Krithia. She helped to break up an Ottoman attack on Y Beach on the night of 1 May and supported an unsuccessful British and ANZAC attack on Krithia five days later, the Second Battle of Krithia.

==== Later operations ====
Implacable, along with the battleships London, Prince of Wales, and Queen, was detached from the Dardanelles on 22 May 1915 to become part of a new 2nd Detached Squadron in the Adriatic Sea to reinforce the Italian Navy after Italy declared war on Austria-Hungary. Implacable arrived at Taranto, Italy, her base for this duty, on 27 May 1915. In November 1915, Implacable transferred to the 3rd Detached Squadron. Based at Salonika, this squadron was organised to reinforce the Suez Canal Patrol and assist the French Navy in blockading the Aegean coasts of Greece and Bulgaria. She shifted her base to Port Said, Egypt, later that month. Implacable departed on 22 March 1916 for a refit in the United Kingdom, arriving at Plymouth Dockyard on 9 April 1916. When her refit was complete, she returned to the 3rd Detached Squadron and was based at Salonika. In June 1917, Implacable was at Athens during the abdication of King Constantine I of Greece.

In July 1917, Implacable returned to the United Kingdom and paid off at Portsmouth to provide crews for anti-submarine vessels, and four main-deck casemates on either side were replaced by two 6-inch guns on her battery deck. She was laid up until March 1918, when she was selected for service as a depot ship with the Northern Patrol at Lerwick, Kirkwall, and Buncrana. In the conversion, she kept her main battery and the four upper-deck 6-inch guns, but the rest of her 6-inch guns were removed, as were her anti-torpedo nets. In November 1918, Implacable was placed on the disposal list, paid off in 1919, and on 4 February 1920 was placed on the sale list. She was sold for scrapping to the Slough Trading Company on 8 November 1921. Resold to a German firm, she was towed to Germany for scrapping in April 1922.
