= Battle of Belmont (1899) =

1899 battle of the Second Boer War

Coordinates: 29°24′58″S 24°22′19″E

- Part of the Second Boer War
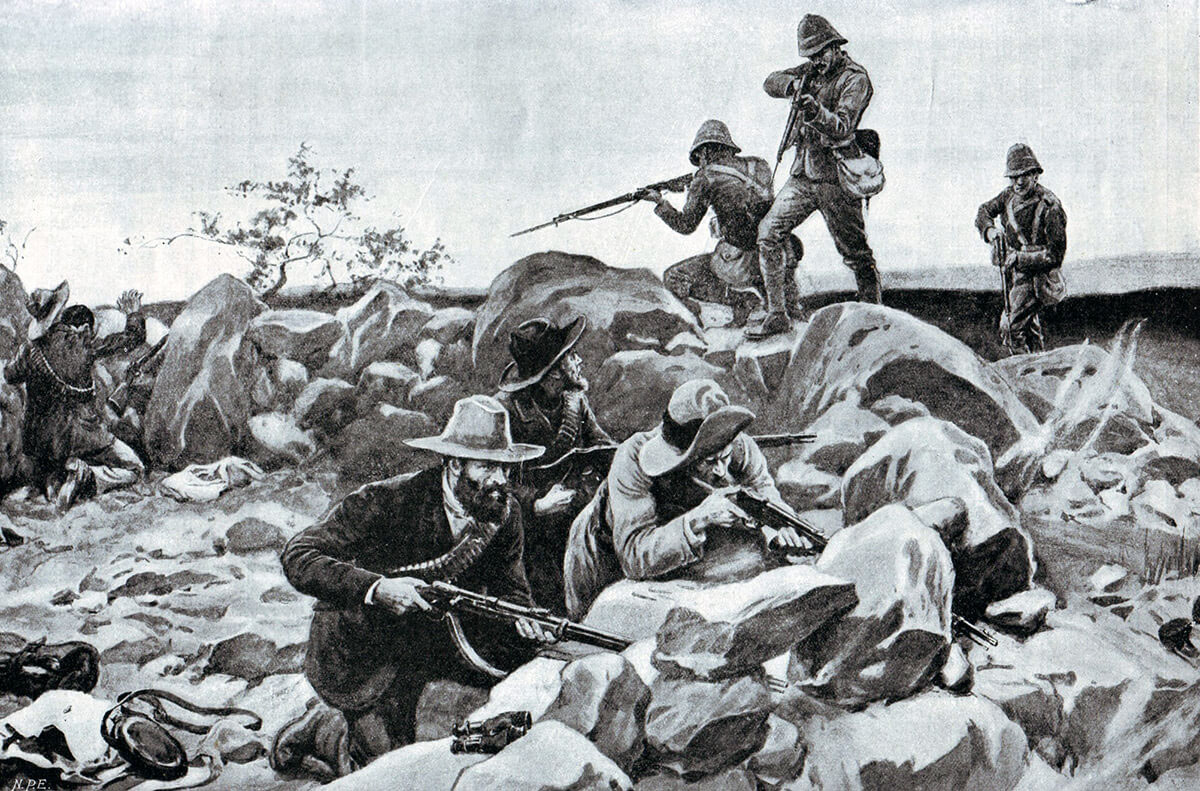
- The Coldstream Guards storming Sugarloaf Hill
Date	23 November 1899
Location	Belmont kopje, Orange Free State
Result	British victory

Belligerents
United Kingdom: New South Wales	South African Republic; Orange Free State

Commanders and leaders
(United Kingdom) Lord Methuen	(South African Republic) Jacobus Prinsloo

Strength
8,000; 16 field guns	2,000

Casualties and losses
75 killed 233 wounded	83 killed 20 wounded 30 captured

The Battle of Belmont was an engagement of the Second Boer War on 23 November 1899, where the British under Lord Methuen assaulted a Boer position on Belmont kopje.

Methuen's three brigades were on their way to raise the Boer siege of Kimberley. A Boer force of about 2,000 men had entrenched on the range of Belmont kopje to delay their advance. Methuen sent the Guards Brigade on a night march to outflank the Boers, but due to faulty maps the Grenadier Guards found themselves in front of the Boer position instead.

The Guards, the 9th Brigade and the Naval Brigade assaulted the Boers over open ground, suffering about 200 casualties. Before the British came to use their bayonets, the Boers retreated by pony and re-formed in another entrenched position at Graspan, where the pattern was repeated with the British suffering another 197 casualties: one sailor reporting that "at 200 yards we fixed bayonets, and we just saw their heels; they didn't wait when they heard the rattle".

== Background ==
In the first days of the Second Boer War, Boer forces besieged British garrisons at Kimberley and Ladysmith. A 40,000-strong Army Corps under the command of General Sir Redvers Buller was dispatched to South Africa and arrived in early November 1899. To relieve Kimberley and Ladysmith, Buller divided his forces, leading one division in an advance on Ladysmith, while the 1st Division of Lieutenant General Lord Methuen was tasked with breaking the Siege of Kimberley.

Methuen planned to advance along the Western Railway from the Orange River to Kimberley, both in order to remain close to his supply line due to a lack of fresh water in the region and pack animals, and to utilize the railway to evacuate all civilians from Kimberley as ordered by Buller. Expecting little resistance, the march was undertaken without secrecy and no attempt was made to deceive the Boers as to its direction. After the arrival of the Naval Brigade with its 4.7-inch guns, it began on 21 November.

Due to a shortage of cavalry, the British force was unable to conduct effective reconnaissance and thus were unaware of the Boer strength and composition, while the latter were appraised of the exact strength and composition of Methuen's force. As prior reconnaissance had located a Boer position slightly north of the Belmont station, 19 miles (31 km) from the march's starting point at the Orange River station, Methuen anticipated that the first fighting would occur there.

== Prelude ==
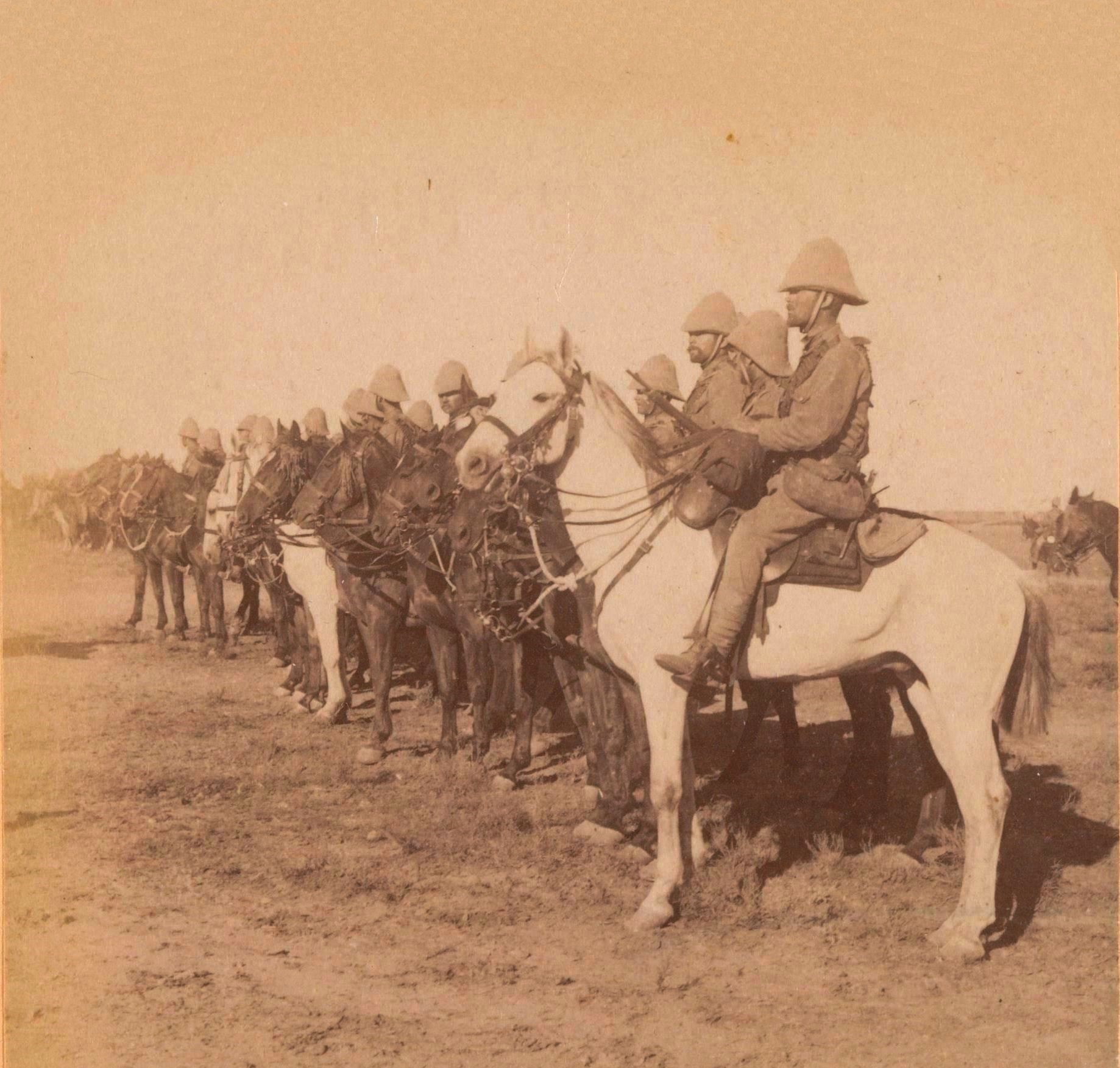
Australian Mounted Rifles before the assault on Belmont

As the British force departed Orange River station, the 9th Lancers and Rimington's Guides conducted a reconnaissance from Fincham's Farm of the Belmont area, spotting several hundred Boers climbing up a kopje. Methuen reached Thomas' Farm, 2 miles (3.2 km) south of Belmont, a day later, where his vanguard was fired upon by the Boers. The Boer fire ceased after British artillery began shelling them, and the British force bivouacked at midnight, anticipating battle in the morning. Without detailed reconnaissance, Methuen planned to focus the attack on the Boer positions running 100 ft above and to the east of the railroad, parallel to the railway line. These were Table Mountain and Gun Hill to the south. After capturing both positions, the British force would advance to the east against the other Boer line running parallel to the railway, which included Sugar Loaf Hill and Razor Back to the south and Mount Blanc, which, 100 ft higher than Table Mountain, dominated the region.

== Order of Battle ==
=== British Forces ===
1st Division	Lieutenant-General Lord Paul Sanford Methuen GCB, GCMG, GCVO
Division Troops
9th Lancers	9th Brigade: Major-General Charles Whittingham Douglas
18th Field Battery, Royal Artillery	1st Battalion Northumberland Fusiliers
7th Field Company, Royal Engineers	1st Battalion Loyal North Lancashire Regiment
Ammunition Column	2nd Battalion Northamptonshire Regiment
75th Field Battery, Royal Artillery	2nd Battalion King's Own Yorkshire Light Infantry
Army Service Corps	2nd Manchester Regiment
1st Royal Munster Fusiliers	New South Wales Lancers
Rimington's Guides	
Infantry Brigades	
1st (Guards) Brigade: Major-General Henry Edward Colville	
3rd Battalion, Grenadier Guards	
1st Battalion, Coldstream Guards Commanded by: Alfred E. Codrington	
2nd Battalion, Coldstream Guards	
1st Battalion, Scots Guards	
No 18 Bearer Company	
No 19 Company Army Service Corps	

=== Boer Forces ===
Commandos under command of Jacobus Prinsloo
Jacobsdal Commando
Winburg Commando
Fauresmith Commando
Bloemfontein Commando
Transvaal State Artillery section. (4x 7.5 cm Krupp Gun and 2x QF 1 pounder pom-pom guns)

== Battle ==
Lord Methuen had planned to surprise the Boers by advancing at night and taking the positions at daybreak. At around 2:55 AM, the British troops began to march out, with the Guards' Brigade marching southeast and the Ninth Brigade marching straight east. A few companies of the Royal Munster Fusiliers and the Yorkshire Infantry remained behind in reserve. The plan was for the 3rd Battalion of the Grenadier Guards and the 1st Battalion of the Scots Guards to storm Gun Hill by flanking it. The remaining two battalions of the Coldstream Guards were to stay in reserve until the others had taken Gun Hill; according to British intelligence, it was a conical hill with only one peak. In actuality, there were two hills; Gun Hill was a saddle-shaped hill with two peaks, and off to the south was another hill, later named Grenadier Hill. Whilst this was occurring, the Ninth Brigade would storm Table Mountain, taking it after a night march. Due to poor reconnaissance and the untimely manner of the night march, the Guards were about 400 yards in front of the two hills and not off to the sides of it. The Ninth Brigade faced a similar disposition to the Guards, and were consequently in front of Table Mountain.

At around 3:55 AM, the Grenadier Guards stormed Gun Hill and Grenadier Hill in costly frontal assaults, taking the hills after engaging in hand-to-hand combat with the Boers, the majority of whom retreated on their ponies to other locations. The Scots Guards stormed the other side of Gun Hill in a similar manner and managed to capture around thirty ponies; Lt.-Col. W. P. Pulteney, an officer in the Scots Guards, and some officers and non-commissioned officers managed to mount these ponies and storm the south side of Table Mountain, dismounting after coming under heavy fire, assaulting that part of the hill and taking it. The Ninth Brigade was assaulting the front face of Table Mountain at this time; artillery began to come into action, with the 75th Battery firing shrapnel at Boer positions on Table Mt. With Gun Hill taken, the Coldstream Guards went into action; them and the rest of the Guards marched out in order to take the southern side of Mont Blanc. However, the two battalions of the Coldstream Guards began to come under heavy fire from the southern hills, Sugarloaf and Razorback. These were not mentioned in British reconnaissance, thus Colonel Codrington of the 1st Battalion swung right to try and attack these two positions. The 2nd Battalion, commanded by Colonel Henniker-Major, followed Codrington's battalion. The commander of the Guards' Brigade, General Colvile, wanted to stop this southward movement, and sent Captain H. G. Ruggles-Brise to stop the two battalions. Ruggles-Brise succeeded in reaching the 2nd Battalion, but failed to reach the 1st Battalion. The 18th Battery and the Naval Brigade from the H.M.S. Powerful assisted the Coldstream Battalions, with fire from 15 pounder guns and the 4.7 inch Naval Gun nicknamed 'Joe Chamberlain'. About four companies of the 1st Coldstreams assaulted Sugarloaf whilst three companies, under the direct command of Colonel Codrington, assaulted Razorback. Another company of the 1st Coldstream Guards veered further to the south, assaulting a lone hill and taking it, preventing the Boers from reinforcing via the road to Ramdam and Jacobsdal.

Upon hearing this news, Lord Methuen changed his plan of attack. The Guards Brigade would attack the southern and southeastern faces of Mont Blanc, and the Ninth Brigade would assault the eastern face of Mont Blanc, with the artillery aiding the attack. The Guards Brigade soon reformed and at around 6 AM, they assaulted the southern face of the mountain after taking a Boer laager near Kaffir Kops Farm. The Ninth Brigade soon took Table Mountain and kept the Boers occupied whilst the Coldstream and Grenadier Guards began to march behind them; the three battalions, plus the battalion of Scots Guards, soon charged the rear and sides of the hill, forcing many of the Boers to retreat or surrender, with only a few who chose to fight in hand-to-hand combat. The Ninth Brigade would charge the northern and eastern faces of Mont Blanc, and by 6:30 AM, the Boers had all retreated on the back of their ponies. During the charge on Mont Blanc, many Boers surrendered and would open fire on the British in close range. In another incident, a Captain of the Grenadier Guards assisted a wounded Boer by giving him water; the wounded Boer shot and killed the British captain, and the Boer was subsequently killed by another footguard. After the charge, long-range volleys against the Boers were conducted en masse up to ranges of 2200 yards, but these were unsuccessful. The Naval Brigade attempted to place their guns on Mont Blanc, but were unable to lift it up the steep side of the hill. The New South Wales Lancers, Rimington's Tigers, and Ninth Lancers would pursue the retreating Boers in an intense cavalry battle. The engagement would end at around 10 AM officially.

== Aftermath ==
Lord Methuen wrote to his wife after the battle. "I detest war, people congratulate me; the men seem to look on me like a father, but I detest war the more I see of it.' Outside his tent he could now hear a "poor fellow groaning and dying, shot through the chest, he is silent now, so perhaps God has released him." As many historians of the period and since have pointed out, the reason for such great losses was due to a lack of mobility and poor intelligence in the field with virtually no detailed cartography at the scale needed.

== See also ==
- Military history of South Africa
