= Sinking of HMS Victoria =

1893 shipwreck

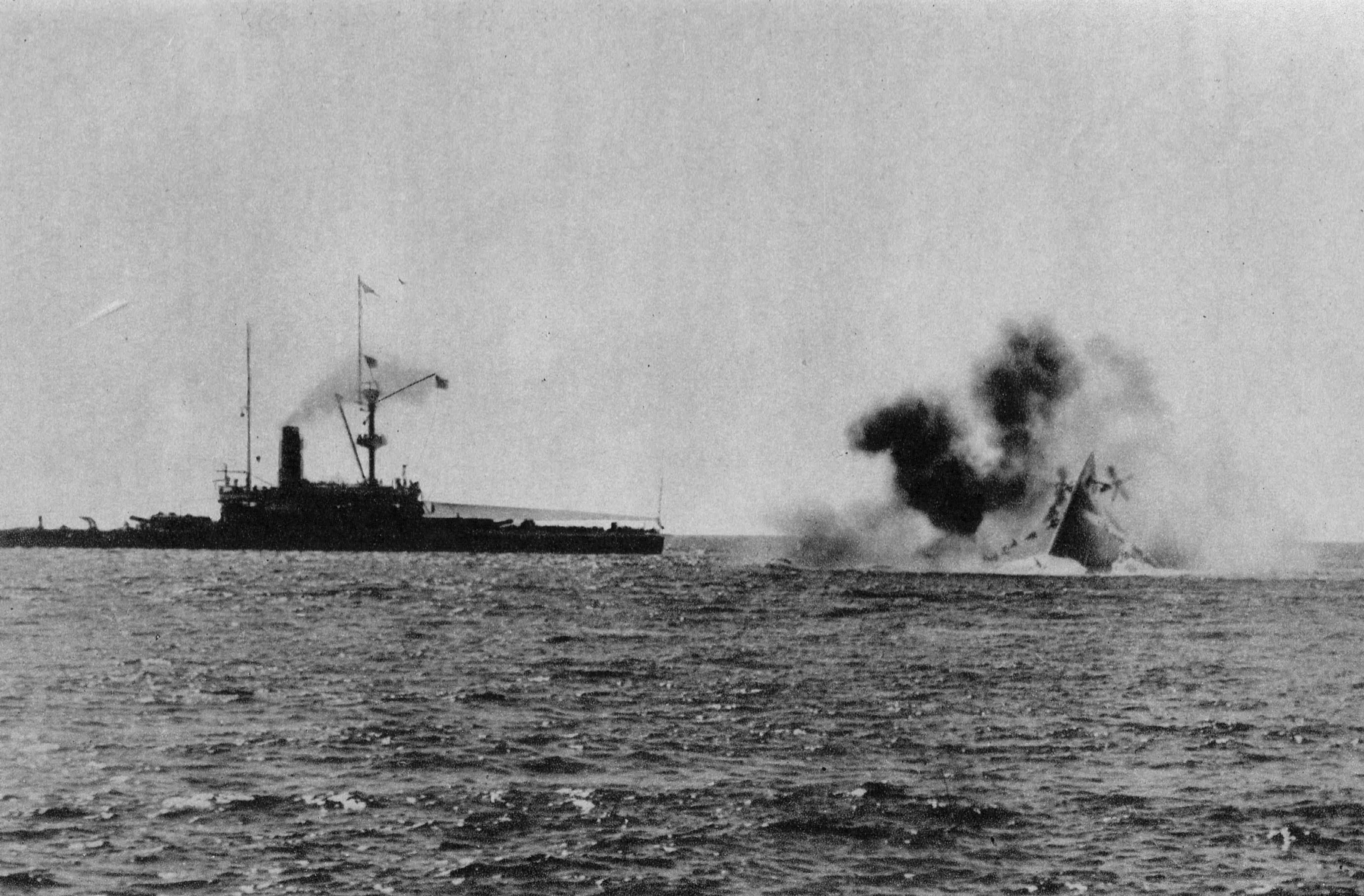
- Victoria sinking after the collision, taken from HMS Collingwood. HMS Nile is on the left.
- Date: 22 June 1893; 133 years ago
- Time: 15:30 EET (13:30 GMT)
- Duration: Approximately 15 minutes
- Location: Eastern Mediterranean, 5 mi (8.0 km) off the coast of Tripoli, Ottoman Empire (now Lebanon); 34°32′0″N 35°50′0″E
- Cause: Collision with HMS Camperdown
- Participants: Crew of HMS Victoria
- Deaths: 358

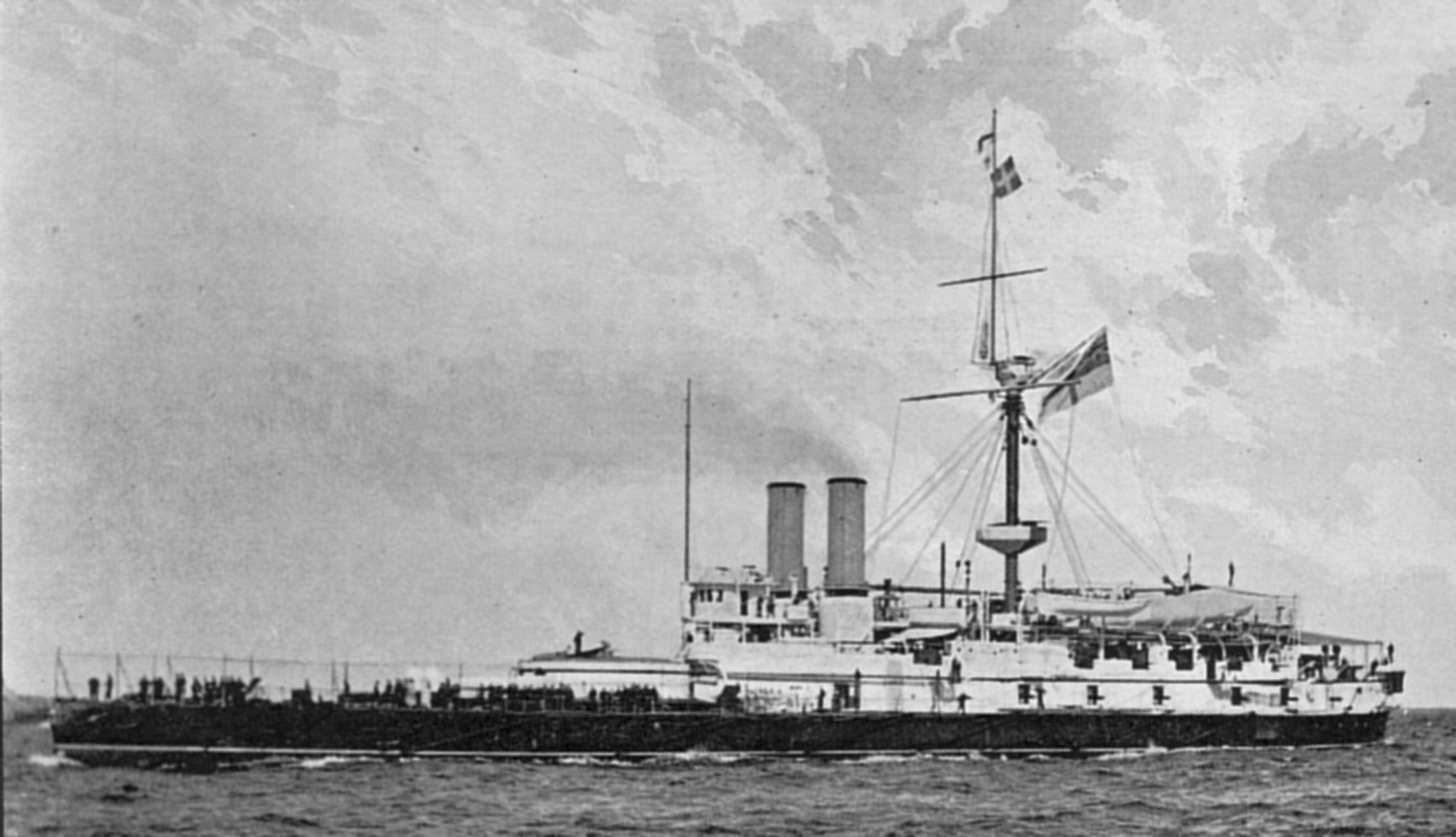
HMS Victoria

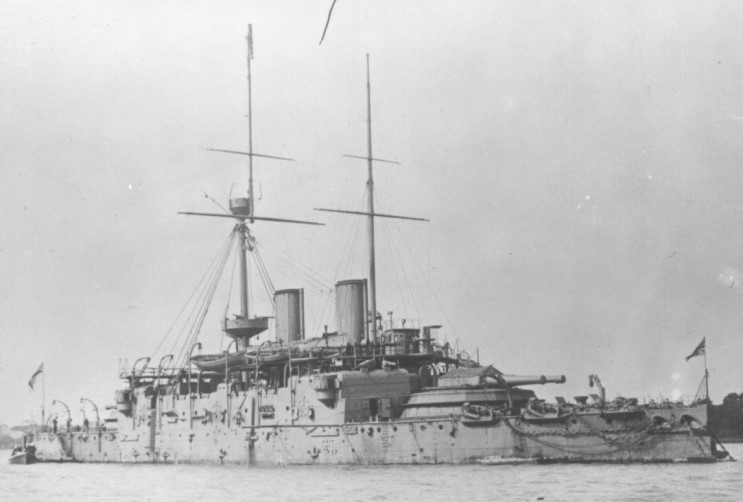
HMS Camperdown

The sinking of HMS Victoria took place at approximately 15:30 on 22 June 1893, after HMS Victoria, the flagship of the Royal Navy's Mediterranean Fleet, collided with HMS Camperdown while on fleet manoeuvres in the Eastern Mediterranean. The collision caused significant damage to Victoria's bow, with a large hole produced causing the ship to rapidly capsize. Victoria took approximately fifteen minutes to sink, with 358 members of the crew, including Vice-Admiral Sir George Tryon, lost in the disaster.

== Background ==
In 1893, the Royal Navy saw the Mediterranean Sea as a vital sea route between Britain and India (via the Suez Canal, completed in 1869), under constant threat from the navies of France and Italy. The impressive naval force that the British concentrated to protect these sealanes made the Mediterranean Fleet one of the most powerful in the world. On 22 June 1893, the bulk of the fleet, eleven ironclads (eight battleships and three large cruisers), were on their annual summer exercises off Tripoli in the Ottoman Empire (now Lebanon).

Vice-Admiral Sir George Tryon, the commander-in-chief of the Mediterranean Fleet, was a strict disciplinarian who believed that the best way to keep his crews taut and efficient was by continuous fleet evolutions, which before the invention of Wireless were signalled by signal flags, semaphore and signal lamp. He had devised a new system of ship handling intended to depart from the system of flag signalling, which was limited in what could be imparted by whatever was in the existing signal book. His speciality was the "TA" system, which took its name from the signal that would indicate it was in operation. Tryon developed the "TA" system as a means for complex manoeuvres to be handled by only a few simple signals, but which required his ships' captains to use their initiative; upon his flying the flag signal "TA", all ships in the formation were to follow the movements of the flagship without the need to wait for or acknowledge any other signals. However, initiative was a quality that had become blunted by decades of naval peace since Trafalgar, and which was unwelcome in a hierarchical navy that deified Admiral Horatio Nelson while misunderstanding what he had stood for. A taciturn and difficult man to his subordinate officers, Tryon habitually avoided explaining his intentions to them, to accustom them to handle unpredictable situations.

== Collision ==
In June 1893, the bulk of the Mediterranean Fleet departed Malta for the Eastern Mediterranean to take part in the annual exercises. On 23 June, having anchored at Beirut, the fleet weighed anchor and headed for sea, with the eleven major ships split into two columns, led by the flagships of the fleet commander and his deputy.

=== Disposition of the fleet ===
Tryon led one column of six ships, which formed the first division of his fleet, in his flagship Victoria travelling at 8 kn (9.2 mph; 15 km/h). His deputy – Rear-Admiral Albert Hastings Markham – was in the lead ship of the second division of five ships, the 10,600 long tons (10,800 t) Camperdown. Markham's normal divisional flagship – Trafalgar – was being refitted. Unusually for Tryon, he had discussed his plans for anchoring the fleet with some of his officers. The two columns were to turn inwards in succession by 180°, thus closing to 400 yd (370 m) and reversing their direction of travel. After travelling a few miles in this formation, the whole fleet would slow and simultaneously turn 90° to port and drop their anchors for the night. The officers had observed that 1,200 yd (1,100 m) was much too close and suggested that the columns should start at least 1,600 yd (1,500 m) apart; even this would leave insufficient margin for safety. The normal turning circles of the ships involved would have meant that a gap between the two columns of 2,000 yd (1,800 m) would be needed to leave a space between the columns of 400 yd (370 m) on completion of the manoeuvre. Tryon had confirmed that eight cables 1,300 m (4,300 ft) should be needed for the manoeuvre the officers expected, but had later signalled for the columns to close to six cables 1,000 m (3,300 ft). Two of his officers gingerly queried whether the order was what he intended, and he brusquely confirmed that it was.

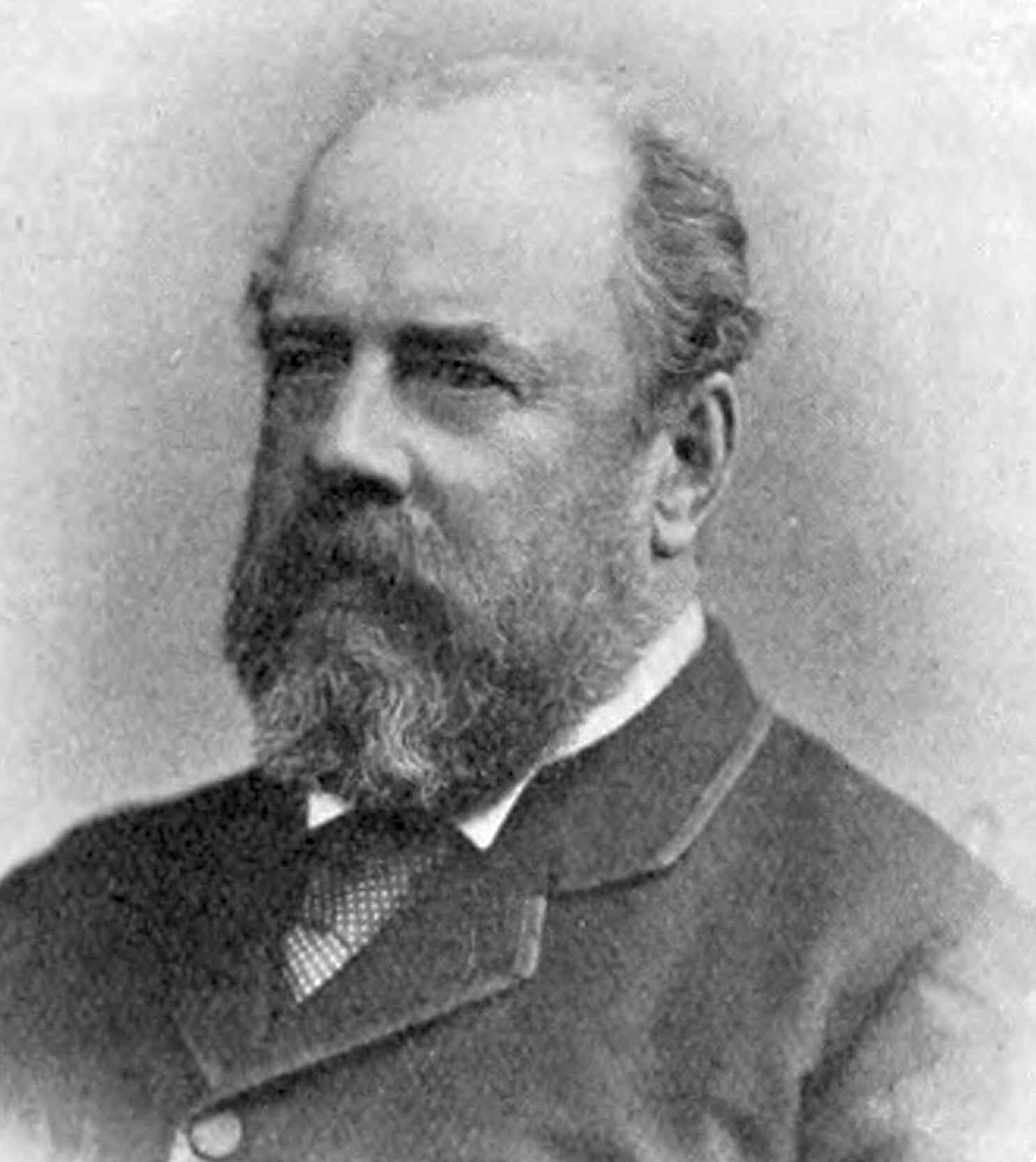
Vice-Admiral Sir George Tryon

He ordered speed to be increased to 8.8 kn (10.1 mph; 16.3 km/h) and at about 15:00 ordered a signal to be flown from Victoria to have the ships in each column turn in succession by 180° inwards towards the other column so that the fleet would reverse its course. However, the normal "tactical" turning circle of the ships had a diameter of around 800 yd (730 m) each (and a minimum of 600 yd (550 m), although standing orders required "tactical rudder" to be used in fleet manoeuvres), so if they were less than 1,600 yd (1,500 m) apart then a collision was likely.

As there was no pre-determined code in the signal book for the manoeuvre he wished to order, Tryon sent separate orders to the two divisions. They were:

"Second division alter course in succession 16 points to starboard preserving the order of the fleet." "First division alter course in succession 16 points to port preserving the order of the fleet."

The phrase "preserving the order of the fleet" would imply that on conclusion of the manoeuvre the starboard column at the start would still be the starboard at the finish. This theory was propounded in 'The Royal Navy' Vol VII pages 415–426. It is suggested here that Tryon intended that one division should turn outside the other; as the two columns began 1,200 yd (1,100 m) apart, turning outside the other, with a turning circle of 800 yd (730 m) would have left them at 400 yd (370 m) apart. This manoeuvre would have required that the two columns turn at separate times and/or with different speeds, rather than simultaneously with the same speed.

Tryon's flag-lieutenant was Lord Gillford, and it was he who received the fatal order to signal to the two divisions to turn sixteen points (a half circle) inwards, the leading ships first, the others of course following in succession.

Although some of his officers knew what Tryon was planning, they did not raise an objection. Markham, at the head of the other column, was confused by the dangerous order and delayed raising the flag signal indicating that he had understood it. Tryon queried the delay in carrying out his orders, as the fleet was now heading for the shore and needed to turn soon. He ordered a semaphore signal be sent to Markham, asking, "What are you waiting for?" Stung by this public rebuke from his commander, Markham immediately ordered his column to start turning. Various officers on the two flagships confirmed later that they had either assumed or hoped that Tryon would order some new manoeuvre at the last minute.

However, the columns continued to turn towards each other and only moments before the collision did the captains of the two ships appreciate that this was not going to happen. Even then, they still waited for permission to take the action that might have prevented the collision. Tryon's flag captain, Maurice Bourke, asked Tryon three times for permission to order the engines astern; he acted only after he had received that permission. At the last moment, Tryon shouted across to Markham, "Go astern! Go astern!"

=== Camperdown strikes Victoria ===
Animation of the sinking. Right column 1: Victoria (red) 2: Nile 3: Dreadnought 4: Inflexible 5: Collingwood 6: Phaeton Left column 7: Camperdown (blue) 8: Edinburgh 9: Sans Pareil 10: Edgar 11: Amphion

By the time that both captains had ordered the engines on their respective ships reversed, it was too late, and Camperdown's ram struck the starboard side of Victoria about 12 ft (3.7 m) below the waterline and penetrated 9 ft (2.7 m) into the ship. The engines were left turning astern, and this caused the ram to be withdrawn and to let in more seawater before all the watertight doors on Victoria had been closed. Two minutes after the collision, the ships were moving apart.

It was a hot afternoon, and a Thursday, which was traditionally a rest time for the crew. All hatches and means of ventilation were open to cool the ship. There was a 100 sq ft (9.3 m^{2}) hole in the side of the ship open to the sea, but initially, Tryon and his navigation officer, Staff Commander Thomas Hawkins-Smith, did not believe the ship would sink, as the damage was forward and had not affected the engine room or ship's power. Tryon gave orders to turn the ship and head for the shore 5 mi (8.0 km) away so she could be beached. Some of the surrounding ships had launched boats for a rescue, but he signalled for them to turn back. Just two minutes after Camperdown backed out of the hole she had created, water was advancing over the deck and spilling into the open hatches. A party under Lieutenant Herbert Heath attempted to unroll a collision mat down the side of the ship to patch the hole and slow the inrush of water, but by the time they could manhandle it into position they were standing in water, and had to abandon the attempt. Five minutes after the collision, the bow had already sunk 15 ft (4.6 m), the ship was listing heavily to starboard and water was coming through the gun ports in the large forward turret. The foredeck became submerged, with the top of the gun turret forming a small island. Although the engine room was still manned and the engines running, hydraulic power for the helm failed so the ship could not be turned and there was no power to launch the ship's boats. Eight minutes after the collision, the entire fore end of the ship was under water, and the water was lapping the main deck. The stern had risen so that the screws were nearly out of the water.

Immediately after the collision, Captain Bourke had gone below to investigate the damage and close the watertight doors. The engine room was dry, but forward in the ship men were struggling to secure bulkheads even as water washed in around them. Already men had been washed away by incoming water or had been trapped behind closed doors. Yet still there had not been sufficient time to close up the ship to stop the water spreading. He returned on deck and gave orders for the men to fall in. The assembled ranks of sailors were ordered to turn to face the side, and then to abandon ship.

Victoria capsized just 13 minutes after the collision, rotating to starboard with a terrible crash as her boats and anything free fell to the side and as water entering through the funnels caused explosions when it reached the boilers. With her keel uppermost, she slipped into the water bow first, propellers still rotating and threatening anyone near them. Most of the crew managed to abandon ship, although those in the engine room never received orders to leave their posts and were drowned. The ship's chaplain, Rev S. D. Morris RN, was last seen trying to rescue the sick: "In the hour of danger and of death, when all were acting bravely, he was conspicuous for his self-denying and successful efforts to save the sick and to maintain discipline. Nobly forgetful of his own safety, he worked with others to the end, and went down with the vessel ... seeing escape impossible he folded his arms upon his breast, and looking up to heaven, his lips moving in prayer, he died." The area around the wreck became a "widening circle of foaming bubbles, like a giant saucepan of boiling milk", which the rescue boats did not dare enter. Onlookers could only watch as the number of live men in the water steadily diminished. Gunner Frederick Johnson reported being sucked down three times, and said that while originally there were 30–40 people around him, afterwards there were only three or four. Lieutenant Lorin, one of the survivors, stated: "All sorts of floating articles came up with tremendous force, and the surface of the water was one seething mass. We were whirled round and round, and half choked with water, and dashed about amongst the wreckage until half senseless." Camperdown was also in a serious condition, with her ram nearly wrenched off. Hundreds of tons of water flooded into her bows, and her foredeck went underwater. Her crew had to construct a cofferdam across the main deck to stop the flooding. As with Victoria, the watertight doors had not been closed in time, allowing the ship to flood. After 90 minutes, divers managed to reach and close a bulkhead door so that the flooding could be contained. The ship returned to Tripoli at one quarter speed with seven compartments flooded.

The other ships had more time to take evasive action, and avoided colliding with each other. Nile was already turning to follow Victoria when the collision happened and came to within 50 yd (46 m) of her as she tried to turn away. Some of the surviving witnesses claimed the distance was even less. Similarly, Edinburgh narrowly avoided running into Camperdown from behind. Inflexible ended up stopped some 200 yd (180 m) from Victoria, and Nile 100 yd (90 m) away.

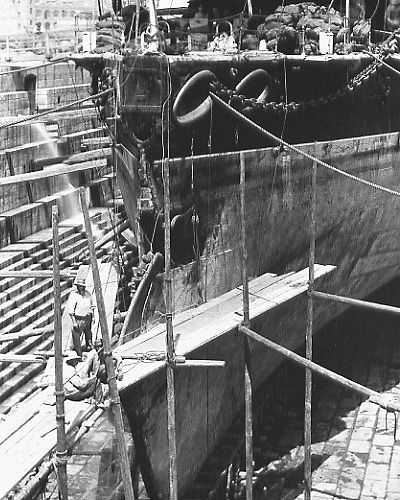
Camperdown's damaged bow.

Of the crew, 357 were rescued and 358 died. Among the dead was a 15-year-old bugler, Walter Langford Collins of Westbury-sub-Mendip, who is commemorated in its churchyard. Collingwood was that day responsible for providing a steam launch for the fleet, so her launch was ready and away within a minute of Camperdown and Victoria disengaging. Captain Jenkins had ignored Tryon's order for the rescue boats to turn back, and picked up the greatest number of the survivors. Six bodies were recovered immediately after the sinking, but although a search was instituted during the night and the following days, no more were found. Turkish cavalry searched the beaches, but no bodies were found there, either. The six were buried the following day in a plot of land provided by the Sultan of Turkey just outside Tripoli. 173 injured officers and men were transferred to the cruisers Edgar and Phaeton and taken to Malta. Commander John Jellicoe, the executive officer of Victoria, who had been bedridden with "Malta fever" for several days, was assisted in the water by Midshipman Philip Roberts-West, and shared the captain's cabin on Edgar after being rescued.

Tryon himself stayed on the top of the chart-house as the ship sank, accompanied by Hawkins-Smith. Hawkins-Smith survived, but described the force of the sinking and being entangled in the ship's rigging. He thought it doubtful Tryon could have survived, being less fit than himself.

=== Public response ===
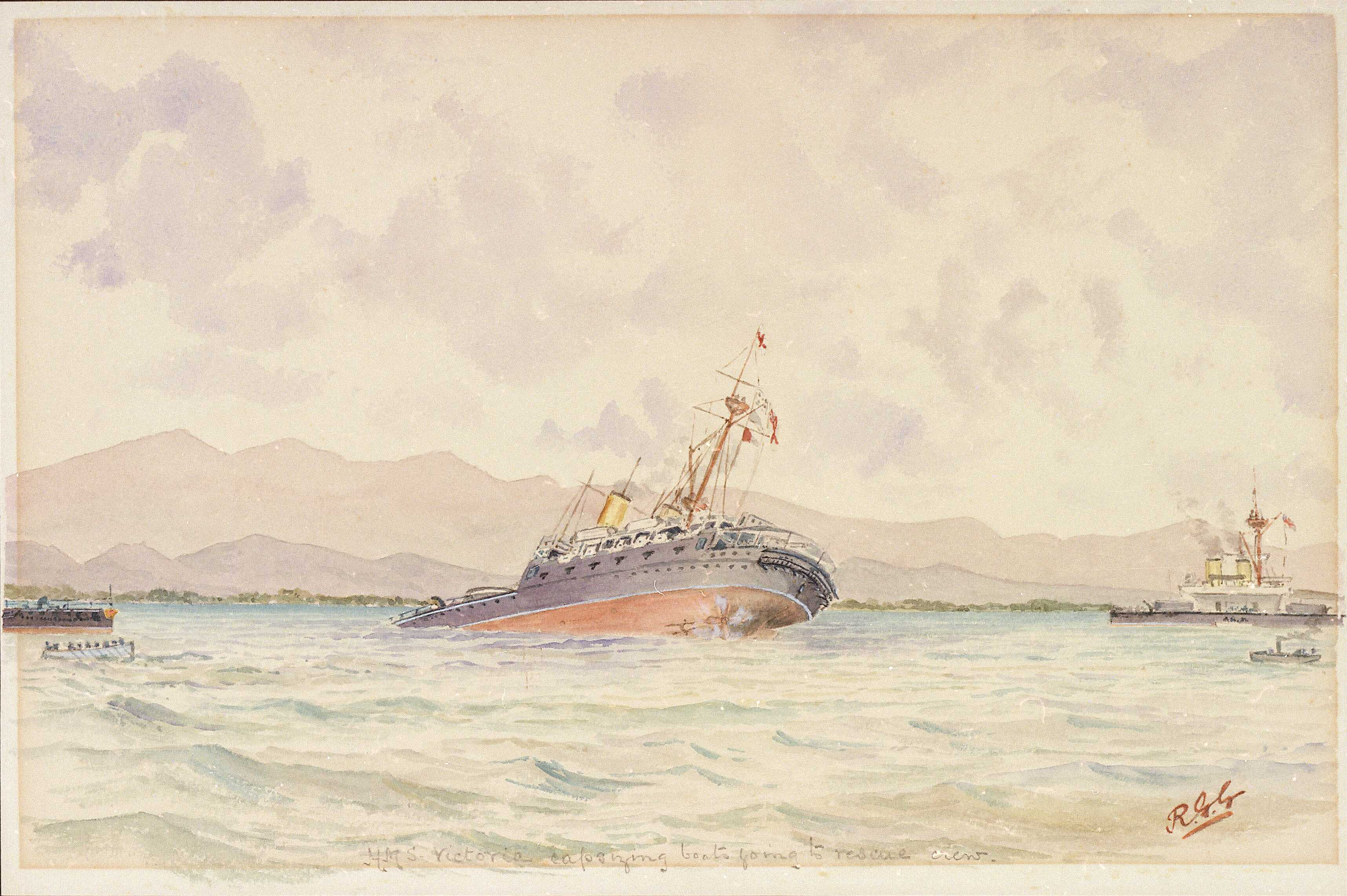
"HMS Victoria capsizing boats going to rescue crew" by Reginald Graham, 1893

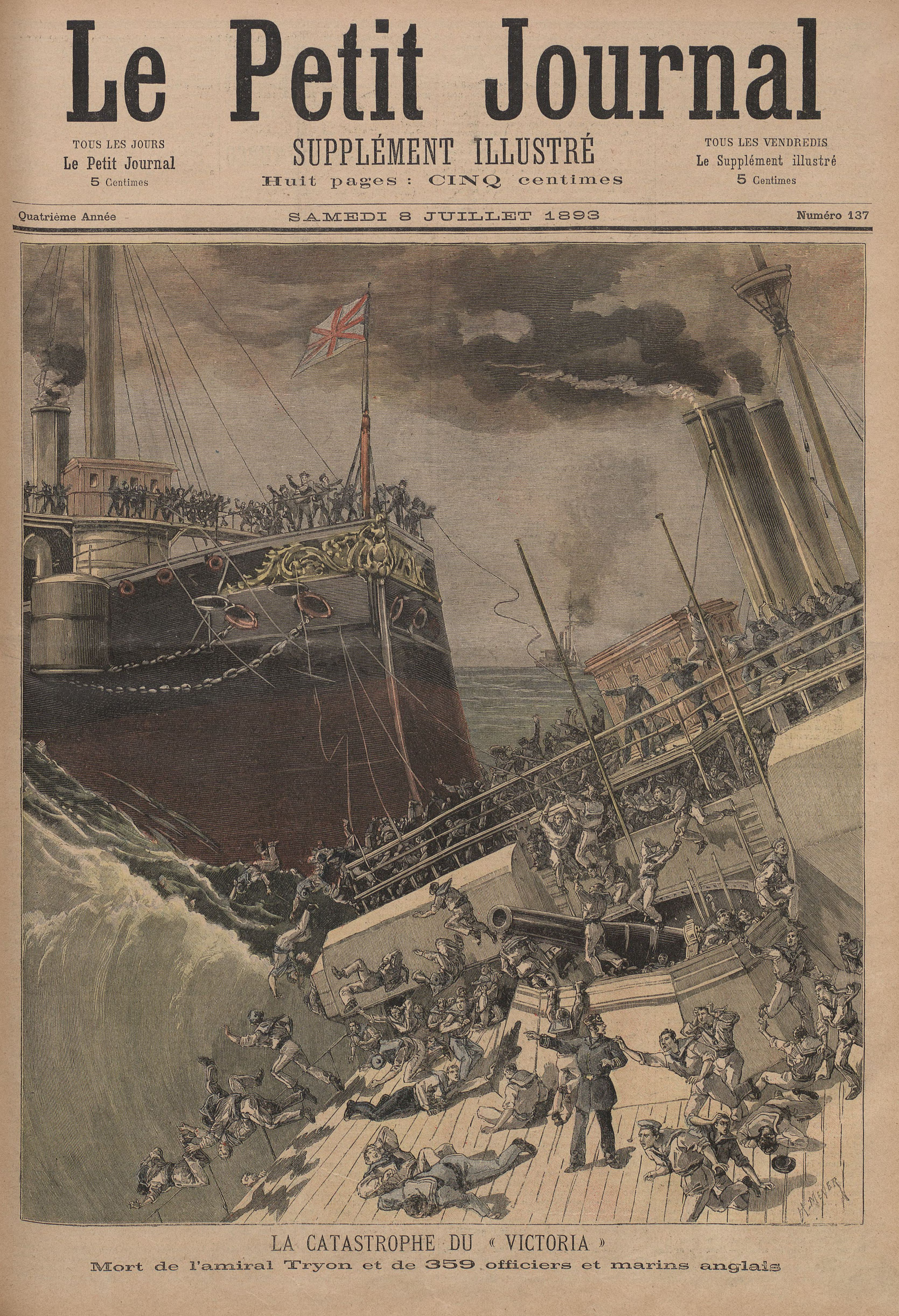
Artistic rendering of the collision between Victoria and Camperdown as it appeared in a French illustrated weekly

The news of the accident caused a sensation and appalled the British public at a time when the Royal Navy occupied a prime position in the national consciousness. News was initially scarce, and a crowd of thousands of friends and relatives laid siege to the Admiralty building awaiting news of relatives. Markham's initial telegram to the Admiralty had only named the 22 officers who had drowned, and further details were slow to arrive. Many immediately laid blame on Tryon, as the obvious "scapegoat". Later, as more information reached England, more considered questions arose as to how experienced officers could have carried out such dangerous orders. An appeal was launched in London – championed by Agnes Weston of the Royal Sailors' Rest – which raised £50,000 in three weeks to help the dependants of sailors who had lost their lives.

Of immediate concern was why one of Britain's first-class battleships – one of many of similar design – had sunk from a relatively modest injury when rammed at low speed. Although it was vital to determine exactly what had happened, conducting an inquiry in public was seen as risking the exposure of weaknesses in British ships to enemy navies. (Despite these misgivings, members of the press were eventually permitted to attend the subsequent court martial.) Although the ram as a weapon of war had already been discontinued by the French and was then under debate as to its effectiveness, it was officially pronounced to be an effective and powerful weapon.

=== Court martial ===
A court martial was begun on the deck of HMS Hibernia at Malta on 17 July 1893 to investigate the sinking of Victoria, and to try the conduct of her surviving crew, chief amongst them Captain Bourke. All the crew (except three excused for illness) were required to appear as prisoners before the court. Members of Admiral Tryon's personal staff were not part of the ship's crew and so were not amongst the accused. The court martial was conducted by the new admiral appointed to command the Mediterranean fleet, Sir Michael Culme-Seymour. Culme-Seymour had been carefully chosen for the job both of restoring the confidence of the squadron, and as a safe pair of hands to conduct the enquiry. He was a respected admiral at the end of his career and had not expected further appointments. He came from a family which included several naval officers, was related to the First Lord of the Admiralty, his father had been Queen Victoria's chaplain, and he was recommended for the job by his friend Prince Alfred, who was concerned for his other friend Captain Bourke. Prince Alfred also recommended he take on as secretary his own former secretary, Staff Paymaster Henry Hosking Rickard, who was also appointed Deputy Judge Advocate. He had served the same role in previous courts martial, which was to advise on points of law and to impartially sum up the prosecution and defence cases. Captain Alfred Leigh Winsloe, an expert on signals and fleet manoeuvres, was appointed as prosecutor and had travelled out to Malta with the new admiral and his staff. Vice-Admiral Tracey, superintendent of the Malta Dockyard, plus seven of the fleet captains made up the court. A shorthand writer had to be obtained from Central News. Captain Bourke immediately objected that four of the judges were captains of ships which took part in the incident, including the captain of Camperdown, and these were replaced by other officers.

A widespread theory at the time was that Tryon had mistaken the radius of the ship's turning circle for its diameter, and thus had allowed only two cables space instead of four, plus a safety margin of a further two cables between the two columns of ships. Bourke was questioned about this and stated that this explanation had not occurred to him at the time. However, he also begged the court to allow him not to discuss a conversation with Tryon, where he had pointed out before the collision that Victoria's and Camperdown's turning circles were each about 800 yd (730 m), whereas the admiral had ordered the ships to be spaced only 1,200 yd (1,100 m) apart. Despite Bourke's request not to discuss this point, he raised the matter himself in the court, which had not asked about it. Bourke reported that Tryon had instructed the distance between the ships should remain at six cables, but explained his own inaction in the face of this apparent threat to the ships by saying that he expected Tryon to produce some solution to this apparent mistake at the last minute. Bourke was questioned about Tryon's TA signalling and how this customarily operated. He replied that the admiral would normally go forward during TA, leaving the ships officers aft, whereas otherwise he would remain aft. On this occasion, Tryon had gone forward.

Gillford was called to give evidence, and once again reluctantly told the court that after the collision Tryon had said within his hearing, "It was all my fault". Hawkins-Smith confirmed this, saying he had been on the bridge with Tryon and Gillford after the collision, and had heard Tryon say, "It is entirely my doing, entirely my fault". Hawkins-Smith confirmed to the court that no one believed Victoria could sink as rapidly as she did. No one was asked whether it might have been wiser for the two ships to have remained wedged together, at least until all watertight doors had been properly secured, before separating them and thereby opening the holes in both ships.

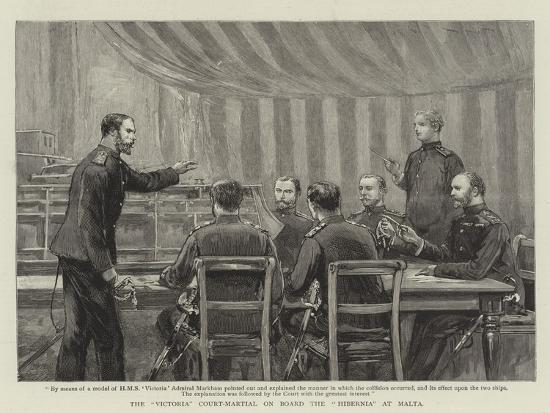
The Victoria court-martial on board HMS Hibernia at Malta, "by means of a model of HMS Victoria, Admiral Markham pointed out and explained the manner in which the collision occurred, and its effect upon the two ships. The Graphic 1893

After two more witnesses, Markham was invited to answer questions as a witness, although his status as a potential future defendant meant the court allowed him later to suggest questions to be put to other witnesses. He explained his confusion when he first received the order to turn, and his refusal to signal compliance because he could not see how the manoeuvre could safely be carried out. He observed that he was aware the ships were passing the point at which they should have turned and a response was urgently required. He stated that he had finally complied, after Tryon had queried his delay, having decided that Tryon must intend to turn slowly, outside Camperdown's turn, so the two lines would pass side by side in opposite directions. The two lines would then have reversed, "preserving the order of the fleet" as it had been before the turn. Markham was then read a memorandum circulated by Tryon just before the fleet had sailed which included the instruction: "When the literal obedience to any order, however given, would entail a collision with a friend...paramount orders direct that the danger is to be avoided, while the object of the order should be attained if possible." Markham observed that while he had not been thinking precisely of the memorandum, he had been thinking of the safety of his ship. When it became apparent that he was on a collision course he could not turn further starboard, nor turn to port as this would have broken "the rule of the road", so that the only thing he could do was full reverse. By mischance, only three-quarters reverse had been signalled. It was put to him that he might have turned harder to starboard, thereby avoiding the collision, but he responded again that this would have gone against 'the rule of the road'. When further questioned, he agreed that "the rule of the road" did not apply during manoeuvres. He also confirmed that throughout the turn he had been closely watching Victoria's helm signals, which indicated how sharply she was turning.

Markham's flag captain, Charles Johnstone, was next to be questioned. He initially confirmed that he had only accepted the order to turn once Markham had produced his explanation of how it might be carried out. Later, however, he admitted that at the time he commenced the turn he still did not understand how it might be concluded successfully. He confirmed that Camperdown had used only 28° of helm instead of the full possible 34°, and had not attempted to turn faster by reversing one of the screws as he might have done. The failure finally to use full reverse in the face of certain collision also remained unexplained. Lieutenant Alexander Hamilton and Lieutenant Barr were both questioned as to what they had heard of conversations amongst the senior officers, making it apparent that confusion continued over what to do at least up to the moment the order to turn was put into effect. Evidence was taken from many other witnesses.

=== Admiralty technical report ===
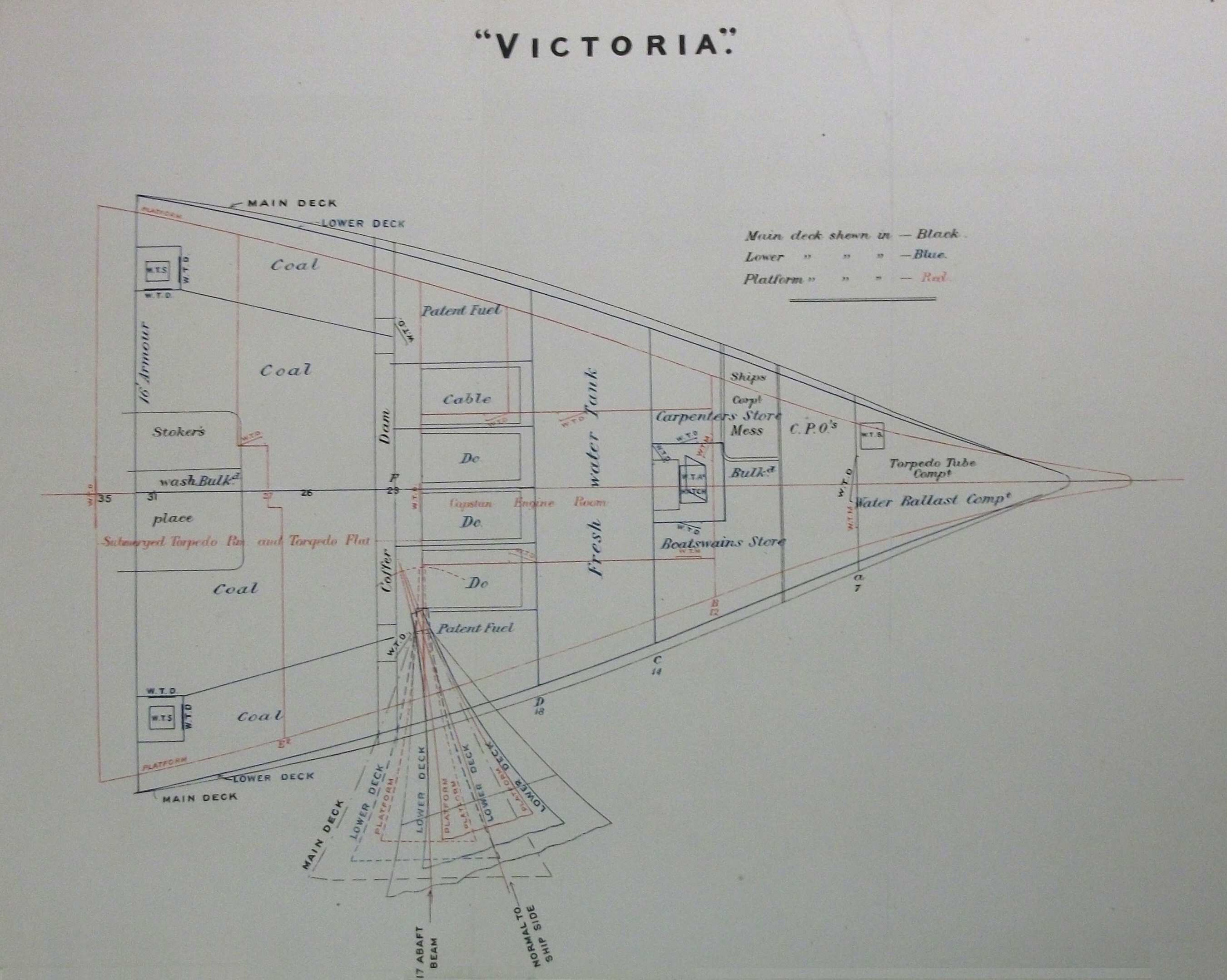
Diagram showing collision point and penetration of Camperdown into Victoria.

In September 1893 a report was published by the Director of Naval Construction, W. H. White, on how the ship had sunk, and it was submitted to parliament in November. It combined evidence from the survivors with the known design details of the ship. Camperdown struck approximately 65 ft (20 m) from the stem of Victoria at an angle of approximately 80°, just ahead of one of the main transverse bulkheads. Camperdown was travelling at about 6 kn (6.9 mph; 11 km/h), so the blow roughly equated with the energy of a shell from one of the 12 in (300 mm) guns then in service, the 45-ton breech-loading rifle (BLR). It pushed Victoria's bow sideways 60–70 ft (18–21 m). Camperdown was most probably held back from driving further into Victoria by coming up against the protective armoured deck running across Victoria below water level. Camperdown's stem penetrated approximately 6 ft (1.8 m) into Victoria's side, while the underwater ram penetrated about 9 ft (2.7 m), 12 ft (3.7 m) below water level. Had Camperdown been travelling more slowly, then it was likely the damage from her stem would have been lessened, but the underwater ram might instead have torn a hole along Victoria's relatively thin lower plating as she continued to move forward. A similar thing had happened in a collision between the German warships SMS König Wilhelm and Großer Kurfürst, causing the latter to sink. This did not happen because the two ships became locked together, although the momentum caused Camperdown to rotate relative to Victoria, tearing the hole wider.

After Camperdown disengaged, the initial inflow of water was limited not by the size of the hole but by the rate at which water could flow out of the immediately affected compartments into adjacent ones. It was noted that there had been insufficient time to close watertight doors, a process which took three or four minutes even when men were on duty and already prepared. The collision was followed by steady sinking of the bow and increasing list to starboard for about 10 minutes, by which time the bow had sunk 23 ft (7.0 m) from its normal height. Approximately half the length of the ship was submerged and the tip of the port propeller was raised above water level instead of 11 ft (3.4 m) below. The ship was heeled over sideways by about 20°. There was then a sudden lurch to starboard and the ship turned over. This was ascribed to water reaching open ports and doors on the gun turret and sides of the ship, which now started to flood new compartments on the starboard side. The ship started to capsize, slowly at first but with increasing speed, accompanied by increasing noise audible on the nearby ships as anything loose fell towards the low side, worsening the process. The ship was still underway at this time trying to reach shore. This tended to force the bow down and more water into the ship, while the rudder jammed hard to starboard tended to increase the heel.

It was estimated from survivor reports that initially twelve watertight compartments were affected, causing a buoyance loss of some 680 long tons (690 t) at the fore end of the ship, mostly concentrated below the level of the armoured deck. Water then spread to other areas, eventually rising to fill the space below the main deck. There were no significant longitudinal bulkheads in the affected areas, which might have had the effect of keeping water out of the port side and thereby accentuating the heel, but the water naturally flooded the holed side first causing the imbalance. No water entered the stokeholds or engine rooms. It was determined that had the gunports and doors at deck level been closed so that water was prevented from entering this way, then the ship would not have capsized. These doors would customarily be closed if the ship was travelling in heavy seas, but were not part of normal procedure for closure in a collision. She might not have foundered at all, but this would have depended on whether various bulkhead doors had been closed or not, which was unclear. Had all doors been closed initially so that only the breached compartments were flooded, then the ship's deck would have likely remained just above water level with a heel of around 9° and Victoria would have been able to continue under her own power.

The report denied that had Victoria's side armour extended as far forward as the point of impact that it could have reduced the damage and saved the ship. It denied that automatic bulkhead doors would have helped, although these were shortly fitted to capital ships throughout the navy. It denied the ship was insufficiently stable, although modifications were then undertaken to the bulkhead arrangement of her sister Sans Pareil.

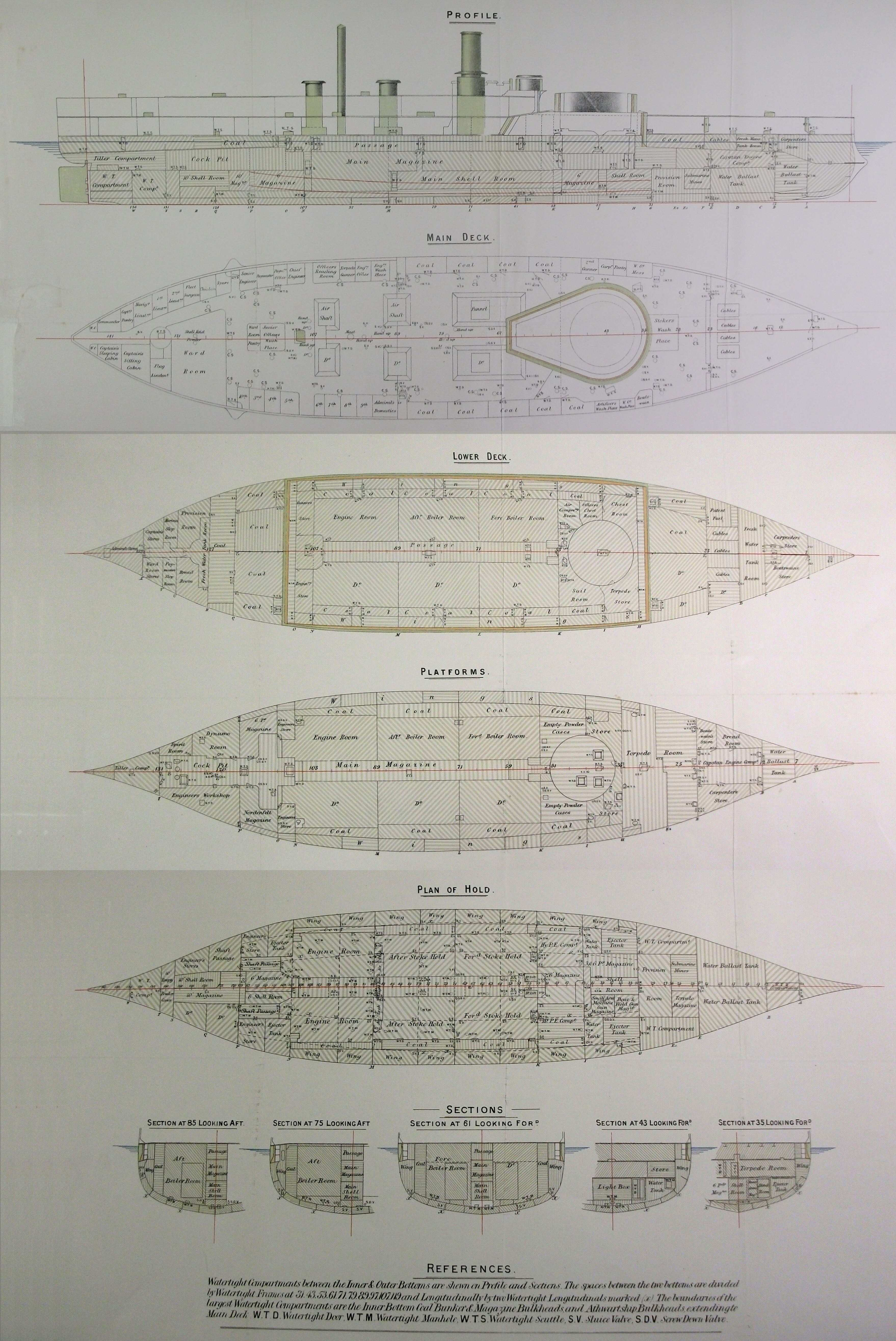
Plan drawings of HMS Victoria

=== Outcomes ===
The court produced five findings:

- That the collision was due to an order by Admiral Tryon.
- That following the accident everything possible had been done to save the ship and preserve life.
- No blame attached to Captain Bourke or any other member of his crew.
- 'The court strongly feel that although it is much to be regretted that Rear Admiral Albert H. Markham did not carry out his first intention of semaphoring to the Commander-in-Chief his doubts as to the signal, it would be fatal to the interests of the service to say that he was to blame for carrying out the directions of the Commander-in-Chief present in person.'
- The court was not able to say why Victoria had capsized.

It was established that the ship would have been in no danger had her watertight doors been closed in time. Bourke was found blameless, since the collision was due to Admiral Tryon's explicit order but the judgement carried an implied criticism of Rear-Admiral Markham. Winsloe complained afterwards that he had not been permitted to properly make his case, and that there was more than enough evidence to convict Markham and others of his crew of negligence. Back in England, confusion reigned in the press as to whether the findings about Markham were an indictment or not, and whether or not it was the duty of an officer to disobey a dangerous order. The Saturday Review commented, "the court has evaded the real point with a slipperiness (for we cannot say dexterity) not wholly worthy of the candour we expect from officers and gentlemen." Captain Gerald Noel of Nile, who had given evidence critical of Camperdown's actions, wrote to Markham observing that things might have turned out better had he been on any ship other than Camperdown, and that in his opinion Captain Johnstone was incompetent. Lord Charles Beresford and Admiral of the Fleet Sir Geoffrey Phipps Hornby published a joint letter in the United Service Gazette that: "Admiral Markham might have refused to perform the evolution ordered, and the Victoria might have been saved. Admiral Markham, however, would have been tried by court-martial, and no one would have sympathised with him as it would not have been realized that he had averted a catastrophe. Unconditional obedience is, in brief, the only principle on which those in service must act." This contrasted with a statement contained in the official signal book: "Although it is the duty of every ship to preserve as correctly as possible the station assigned to her, this duty is not to be held as freeing the captain from the responsibility of taking such steps as may be necessary to avoid any danger to which she is exposed, when immediate action is imperative and time or circumstance do not admit of the Admiral's permission being obtained."

The verdict of the court had to be confirmed by the Admiralty Board in London. They found themselves in a difficulty; although naval opinion seemed to have reached consensus that Markham was significantly to blame, and that it was not acceptable to allow a precedent which any officer causing a disaster by blindly following orders could cite in his defence, it was also felt impossible to severely criticise Markham without blaming Bourke for also failing to take action. As a compromise, a rider was added to the verdict, to the effect that Markham had no justification for his belief that Victoria would circle around him, and thus he should have taken action much sooner to avoid collision. Captain Johnstone was also criticised, both for failing in his own independent responsibility to safeguard the ships, and for failing to expeditiously carry out orders when the collision was imminent.

Markham and Johnstone both continued to feel aggrieved by the verdict, seeking to take the matter to a further court-martial to clear their names. It fell to Culme-Seymour to convince them that they had been dealt with lightly, and any further case could only go against them. Markham completed the remaining months of his posting in the Mediterranean, but was then placed on half pay without a command. He received minor postings and achieved the rank of admiral before retiring, aged 65, in 1906.

Tryon's TA system – and with it his attempt to restore Nelsonian initiative into the Victorian-era Royal Navy – died with him. Whether or not Tryon had intended the system to be in effect at the time of the accident, traditionalist enemies of the new system used the collision as an excuse to discredit and bury it. To some extent, this was mitigated by the introduction of wireless communication some six years later. Heavy reliance upon detailed signalling – and the ethos of reliance upon precise orders – continued within the navy right through to the First World War. Several incidents occurred where reliance upon specific orders or signal failures allowed lucky escapes by the enemy in that war, so that had the sinking not occurred and Tryon survived to continue his campaign, there might have been a significant improvement in British performance.

Five years after the incident, only Camperdown was still in active service, the rest of the then front-line battleships having been relegated to guard duties as obsolete.

There is a legend that Tryon's wife was giving a large social party in their London home at the time his ship collided with Camperdown, and that Admiral Tryon was seen descending the staircase by some of the guests.

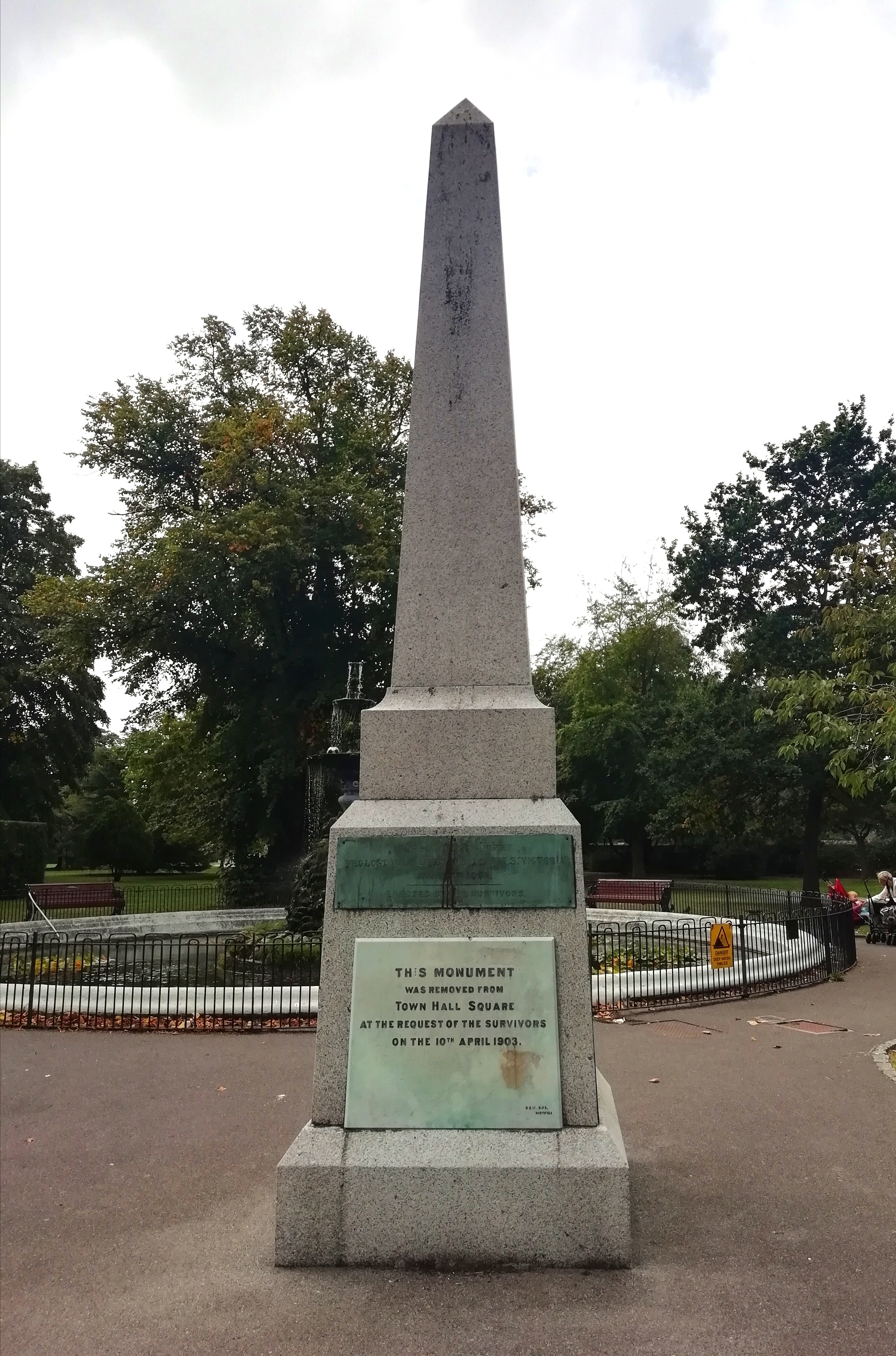
The memorial in Victoria Park, Portsmouth, to the crew killed in the accident.

There is a memorial to the crew killed in the disaster in Victoria Park, Portsmouth. It was originally erected in the town's main square, but at the request of survivors was moved to the park in 1903 where it would be better protected.

A scale section of Victoria – a popular exhibit on display at the World's Columbian Exposition in Chicago at the time of the accident – was subsequently draped in black cloth as a tribute to the loss.

In 1908, Good Hope and Argyll were given orders that might have led to a collision, but Rear-Admiral Percy Scott implemented a different course than was ordered, ensuring no risk of collision.

=== Tryon's intentions ===
No definite conclusion has ever been reached as to what Tryon intended to happen during the manoeuvre. Two possible explanations have been proposed.

The first is that Tryon was mistaken in the orders which he gave. It has variously been suggested that he might have been ill or indisposed in some way, supported by his curt comments to officers who queried him at the time, and his apparent inattention to the results when the manoeuvre commenced. Alternatively, that he was of sound mind, but mistook the turning circle of the ships involved. It has been suggested that a much more frequent manoeuvre was a turn of 90°, for which a space allowance of two cables per ship would have been correct. On this basis, the ships would have completed their turns inwards at a spacing of two cables, then re-traced their course to the correct point to turn to their final anchor positions. Whatever the possible reason for the initial mistake, some confirmation of this explanation comes from the reported statement of Lieutenant Charles Collins, who had been officer of the watch on Victoria at the time of the incident. Memoirs written by Mark Kerr related that Collins had confirmed to him that Tryon had admitted on the bridge that this was the mistake he had made. The historian Geoffrey Bennett has gone so far as to suggest that Tryon's incomprehensible letters to Lord Charles Beresford indicate that he "was suffering from some deterioration of the brain; that his fatal error was no mental aberration such as is to be expected of the young and inexperienced, but the consequence of a disease which at times clouded and confused his judgement and ideas."

The second possibility is that Tryon fully intended the order which he gave and – understanding the objections raised by his officers – still chose to put it into effect. Tryon had ordered an identical manoeuvre during different exercises in 1890, but on that occasion the turn was cancelled because the commander concerned declined to signal an acceptance of the order before it became too late to carry it out (in fact the man who had been in Markham's position on that occasion was Vice-Admiral Tracey, who now sat on the panel). Markham came up with his own suggestion as to how it might be possible to carry out the order, with one line of ships turning outside the other. However, he insisted that he believed Tryon intended to turn outside Markham's ships, despite the navigation signals being flown by Victoria that she was turning at maximum helm. It has been suggested that unlike Markham's assessment, Tryon intended to take a tight curve and leave it to Markham to avoid him, by taking the outside position around the curve.

Support for this came initially from a journalist and naval historian William Laird Clowes who suggested that Queen's Regulations required "If two ships under steam are crossing so as to involve risk of collision, the ship which has the other on its starboard side shall keep out of the way of the other," which would place the onus upon Camperdown to take avoiding action. Clowes also maintained that in any contention between a ship carrying the commander and another, it was the responsibility of the other ship to keep clear from the path of his commander. Although this particular form of turn was not included in the official manoeuvering book, it was mentioned in other standard texts of seamanship. This view has been taken by others, who have added to the argument Tryon's behaviour, which was consistent with his having set a TA problem for his subordinate to solve and therefore followed his normal habit of not explaining his intentions or intervening until afterwards. Others have argued that the witnesses' accounts suggest Tryon accepted having made a mistake, and that had one column of ships passed outside the other instead of both turning inwards, they would then have been in the wrong formation to approach their normal positions at the anchorage. Debate has also centred upon whether the flag signals instructions "...preserving the order of the fleet" imply that afterwards the ships should be in two columns as before (i.e. Camperdown in the starboard column) or whether the signals only meant that each division should still be in one column with the same order of ships, but that it could have swapped sides with the other column.

== Wreck site ==
After a search that lasted ten years, the wreck was discovered on 22 August 2004 in 140 metres (460 ft) of water by the Lebanese-Austrian diver Christian Francis, aided by the British diver Mark Ellyatt. She stands vertically with her bow and some 30 metres of her length buried in the mud and her stern pointing directly upwards towards the surface. This position is not unique among shipwrecks as first thought, as the Russian monitor Rusalka also rests like this. The unusual attitude of this wreck is thought to have been due to the heavy single turret forward containing the main armament coupled with the still-turning propellers driving the wreck downwards.

The 1949 Ealing comedy Kind Hearts and Coronets features a satire of the accident, in which Alec Guinness plays Admiral Lord Horatio D'Ascoyne, who orders a manoeuvre that causes his flagship to be rammed and sunk by another ship in his fleet. Guinness noted that his portrayal of the admiral was based on an officer he knew during his training during the Second World War.

== Bibliography ==
- „Victoria“'s Undergang - Tidsskrift for Søvæsen (1893, page 244)
- Bennett, Geoffrey (1968). Charlie B: A Biography of Admiral Lord Beresford of Metemmeh and Curraghmore. London: Peter Dawnay Ltd.
- Andrew Gordon, The Rules of the Game: Jutland and British Naval Command, John Murray.
- Richard Hough, Admirals in Collision, Hamish Hamilton, London. Copyright 1959.
- Ms. Acland d.55, letters from William D. Acland to his wife. Bodleian Library, Special Collections. University of Oxford
