= HMS Doris (1896) =

Eclipse-class cruiser

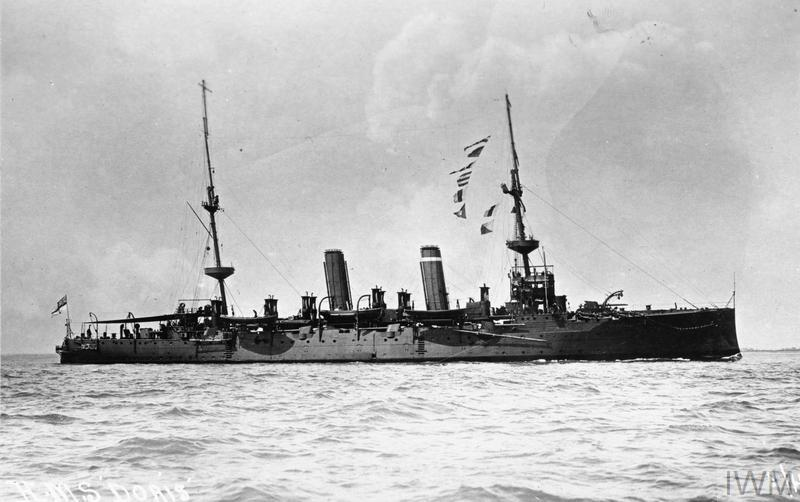
- Doris during World War I

History

United Kingdom
- Name: HMS Doris
- Builder: Naval Construction & Armaments Co., Barrow-in-Furness
- Laid down: 29 August 1894
- Launched: 3 March 1896
- Completed: 18 November 1897
- Reclassified: As depot ship, 1917
- Fate: Sold for scrap, 2 February 1919

General characteristics
- Class & type: Eclipse-class protected cruiser
- Displacement: 5,600 long tons (5,690 t)
- Length: 350 ft (106.7 m)
- Beam: 53 ft 6 in (16.3 m)
- Draught: 20 ft 6 in (6.25 m)
- Installed power: 9,600 ihp (7,200 kW); 8 cylindrical boilers
- Propulsion: 2 shafts, 2 Inverted triple-expansion steam engines
- Speed: 18.5 knots (34.3 km/h; 21.3 mph)
- Complement: 450
- Armament: As built: 5 × QF 6-inch (152 mm) guns; 6 × QF 4.7-inch (120 mm) guns; 6 × 3-pounder QF guns; 3 × 18-inch torpedo tubes; After 1905: 11 × six-inch QF guns; 9 × 12-pounder QF guns; 7 × 3-pounder QF guns; 3 × 18-inch torpedo tubes
- Armour: Gun shields: 3 in (76 mm); Engine hatch: 6 in (152 mm); Decks: 1.5–3 in (38–76 mm); Conning tower: 6 in (152 mm)

HMS Doris was an Eclipse-class cruiser built for the Royal Navy in the mid-1890s. It was one of nine such protected cruisers, all of which launched between 1896 and 1899.

== Specifications ==
The Eclipse-class was the direct successor to the Astraea-class. It were larger in size and displacement, and received stronger armor and armor with a similar speed to its predecessors.

HMS Doris had a displacement of 5,690 tonnes (5,600 long tons) at an overall length of 113.7 m, width of 16.3 m and draft of 6.25 m. The ship was driven by two triple-cylinder vertical triple expansion steam engines, supplied by 8 coal-fired boilers, which moved a pair of propellers. The engines reached 8000 horsepower, giving a top speed of 18.5 knots. The normal stockpile of coal was 550 tons, and at maximum capacity the ship could take almost twice as much fuel at 1075 tons. The initial crew of the ship consisted of 393 officers and sailors.

The cruiser was initially armed with five single-arm 152-millimetre (6.0 in) guns, six 120 mm (4.7 inch) guns, six three-pound (47 mm) guns, and three 18-inch (450 mm) torpedo tubes. After the modernization of 1903–1905, the armament of the ship was as follows: eleven 152 mm guns, nine twelve-pound guns (76 mm), seven three-pound guns (47 mm) and three 450 mm torpedo launchers. During the First World War, the armament was limited to nine 152 mm guns, four 76 mm guns and one 47 mm gun, leaving torpedo armament unchanged. The deck armor had a thickness of 38 to 76 millimetres (1.5 to 3.0 in) with the command tower having a thickness up to 152 mm. Main artillery pieces were protected by 76 mm thick casings.

== Service history ==
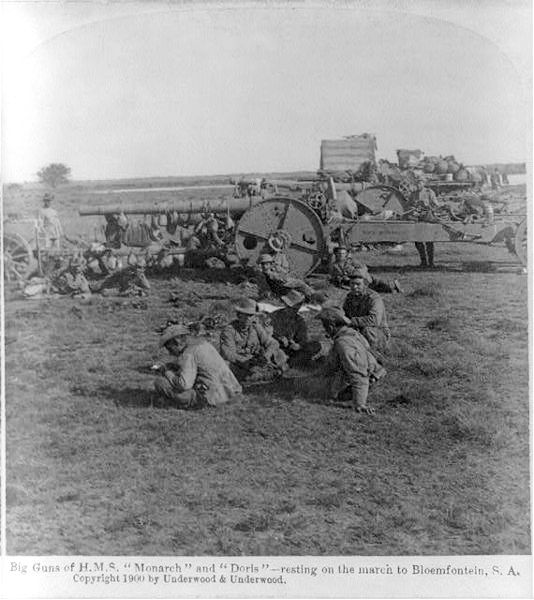
One of Doris's guns on the march to Bloemfontein

She was the flagship of Vice-Admiral Sir Robert Harris when he was Commander-in-Chief, Cape of Good Hope Station in South Africa 1898-1900. In late 1899 at least one of HMS Doris's QF 4.7-inch (120 mm) guns was mounted on an improvised field carriage and used as a field gun in the Second Boer War, when a party of naval officers under the command of Captain Reginald Prothero of the Doris took part in the war. The gun used at Magersfontein was known as Joe Chamberlain.

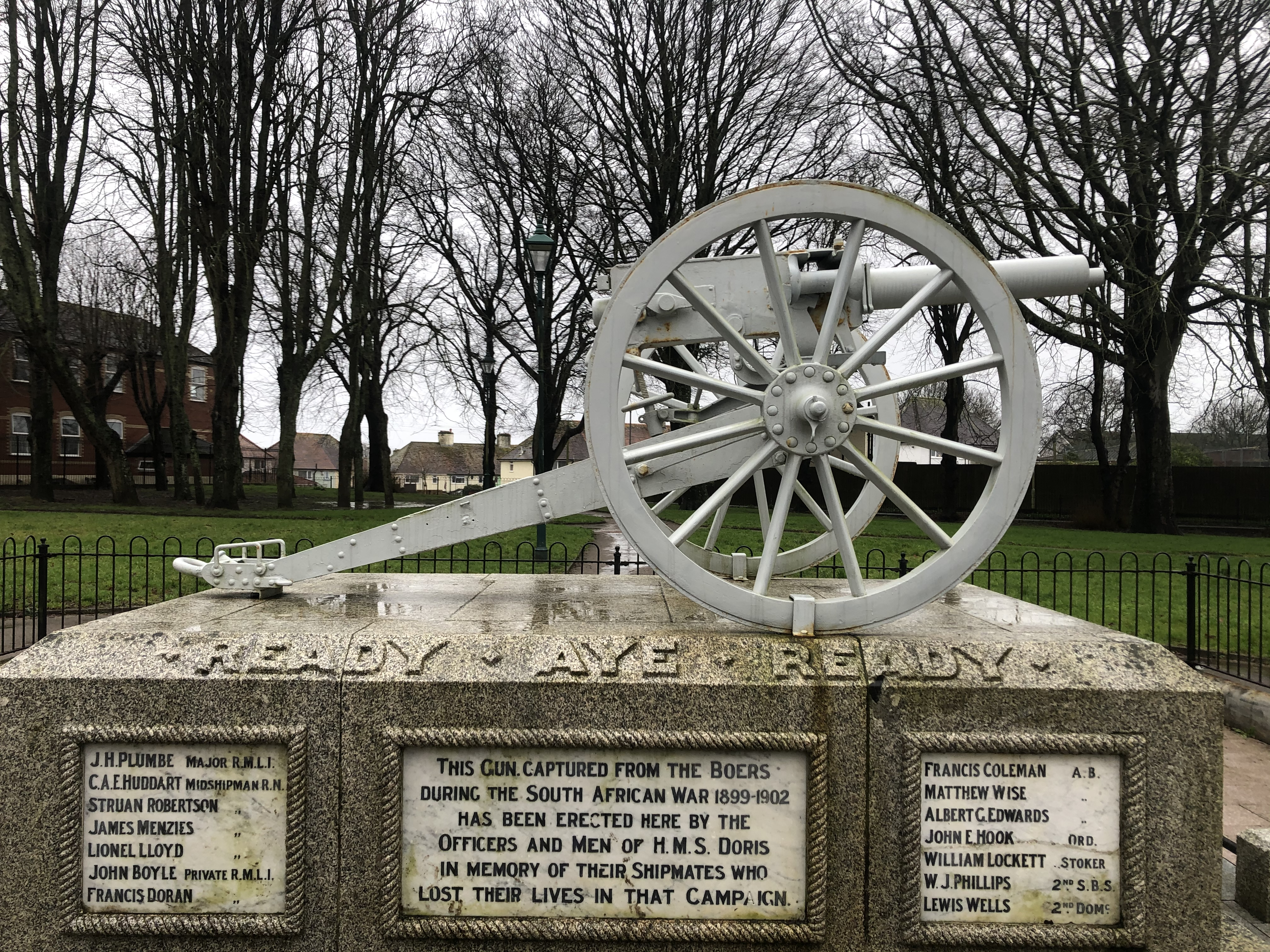
A captured gun erected as a War Memorial to the officers and men of HMS Doris who lost their lives during the South African War 1899-1902

She paid off at Devonport in May 1901, when, to honour her crew, the men of the other ships in the harbour spontaneously manned yards and sides and gave a salute.

After a refit, she was on 4 June 1902 commissioned into the Channel Squadron with the crew of HMS Arrogant. She took part in the fleet review held at Spithead on 16 August 1902 for the coronation of King Edward VII, and visited Souda Bay, Crete for combined maneuvers with other ships of the Channel and Cruiser squadrons the following month. In October she visited Tetouan.

In April 1911 she was on station with the Atlantic Fleet at Gibraltar.

=== First World War ===
When the First World War began in August 1914, Doris was serving with the 11th Cruiser Squadron of the Home Fleet, and her Captain was Frank Larken On 5 August, Doris captured a German merchant ship.

By November 1914, Doris was cruising off the West Coast of Ireland. On 7th of that month she was ordered to proceed to Alexandria to form part of the Allied force opposing Turkey. She was ordered to patrol the Syrian coast, looking out for enemy ships and shore installations, and to "exercise general pressure."

On 15 December Doris was lying off the Syrian coast near Beersheba when she spotted suspicious activity on a bluff commanding the shore. Closing in, her crew discovered it was a Turkish defensive position in the course of construction, and Captain Larken gave orders to open fire with one of the ship's main guns. The emplacement was swiftly destroyed.

From Beersheba, Doris proceeded to the Gulf of Alexandretta, where she landed shore parties to disrupt Turkish communication lines, destroying telegraph lines and railway tracks. Anchoring off the harbour of Alexandretta, Larken sent word to the Military Governor of the town demanding that "All munitions of war, mines and locomotives" be handed over to his crew to be destroyed, and that all British and Allied subjects be surrendered to him, along with their families and effects. Failure to comply would result in the town being shelled.

The Governor communicated with Djemal Pasha, Military Commander of Greater Syria, who was not a man to be intimidated. Not only did Djemal Pasha refuse the demands, but he threatened that, if Larken opened fire on Alexandretta, one British captive would be shot for every Ottoman subject killed in the bombardment.

In the event, negotiations were carried out through the American Consul in Alexandretta, and the Turks took the opportunity to evacuate all military stores and equipment from the town, before two railway locomotives were destroyed in a token gesture.

Doris continued to patrol the Syrian coast until March 1915, carrying out thirteen landing operations and many coastal bombardments before being relieved by the French.

On 25 April 1915, Doris participated in a shore bombardment near Bulair along the western coast of the Gallipoli peninsula, intended as a diversionary feint for the main troop landings at Cape Helles area.

From March 1917 to November 1918, she was stationed in India, where she served as a hulk. Doris was sold on February 2, 1919, in Mumbai.
