= Boer commando =

Kommando
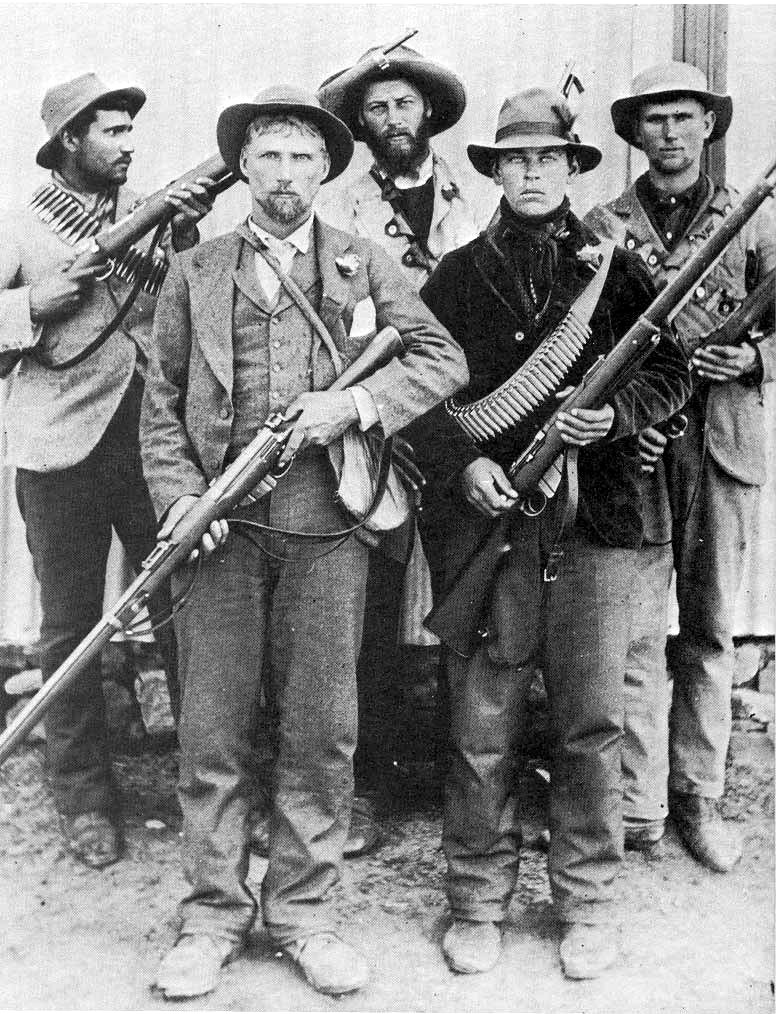
- Active: 18th century–1902
- Country: South African Republic Orange Free State
- Branch: Militia
- Type: Guerrilla fighter, military volunteer
- Engagements: Boer Wars, Xhosa Wars, Maritz rebellion

The Boer Commandos or "Kommandos" were volunteer military units of horse-mounted light infantary guerrilla militia organized by the Boer people of South Africa. From this came the term "commando" into the English language during the Second Boer War of 1899–1902. The formation of modern military commandos during World War II was inspired by Britain's experience combating Boer Commandos during the Boer War.

== History ==
In 1658, war erupted between the Dutch settlers at the Cape Colony and the Khoi-khoi and San. In order to protect the settlement, all able bodied men were conscripted. After the conclusion of this war, all men in the colony were liable for military service and were expected to be ready on short notice.

=== Burgher Commandos ===
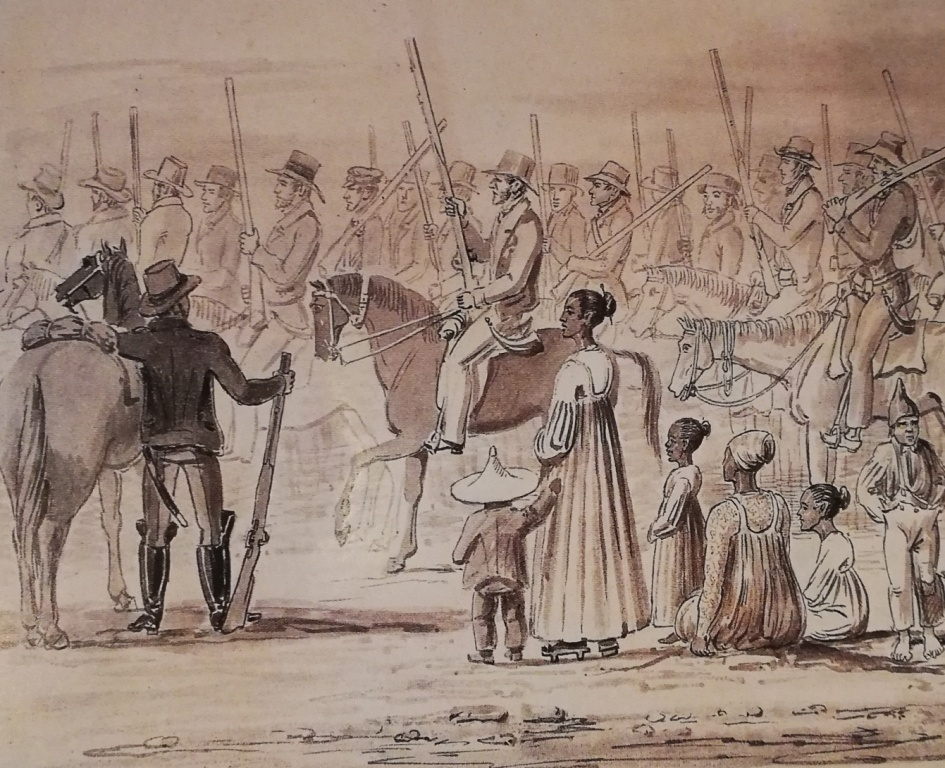
Cape Mounted Burghers, or "kommando," assembling for action in 1846 during the Seventh Xhosa War.

By 1700, the size of the colony had increased immensely and it was divided into districts. This was partily due to increased conflict between expanding Dutch pastralist Trekboers and the native hunter-gather San peoples in the colony's arid interior and the resulting increase in competition for natural resources. San raids prompted the Trekboers form militia units, first to mount punitive expeditions, then increasingly to pre-empt possible attacks. This period of conflict with the San would continue throughout the whole of the eighteenth century along the frontier of the Dutch Cape Colony.

The small military garrison stationed at the Castle de Goede Hoop could not be counted on to react swiftly in the border districts, therefore the commando system was expanded and formalized. Each district had a Kommandant who was charged with calling up all burghers in times of need.

During the first British invasion of the Cape Colony in 1795 and the second invasion in 1806, the commandos were called up to defend the Cape Colony. During the Battle of Blaauwberg in January 1806, the Swellendam Commando held the British off long enough for the rest of the Batavian army to retreat to safety.

Under British rule, the Cape Colony continued to use the commando system in its frontier wars agianst the amaXhosa, in addition to regular British imperial troops. Boer commandos fought alongside Fengu, British settlers, Khoi-khoi and other ethnic groups in units which were often mixed. Light, mobile commandos were undeniably better-suited than the slow-moving columns of imperial troops, for warfare in the rough frontier mountains. However, tensions often arose in the Cape's government over the relative merits and control of these two parallel military systems.

=== Boer Commandos ===
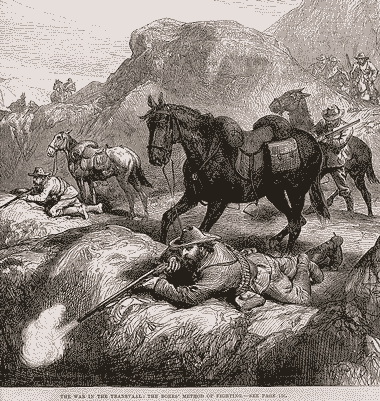
Boer Commando in action during the First Boer War, 1881

During the Great Trek, this system was used and remained in use in the Boer republics. Both republics issued commando laws, making commando service mandatory in times of need for all male citizens between the ages of 16 and 60.

During the Second Boer War (1899–1902) the Boer commando formed the backbone of the Boer forces.

=== South African Commando System ===
After the declaration of peace in 1902, the commandos were disbanded. They did re-form themselves in clandestine "shooting clubs". In 1912, the commandos were re-formed as an Active Citizen Force in the Union Defence Force. This system was in operation until 2005, when all commandos were disbanded again.

== Structure ==
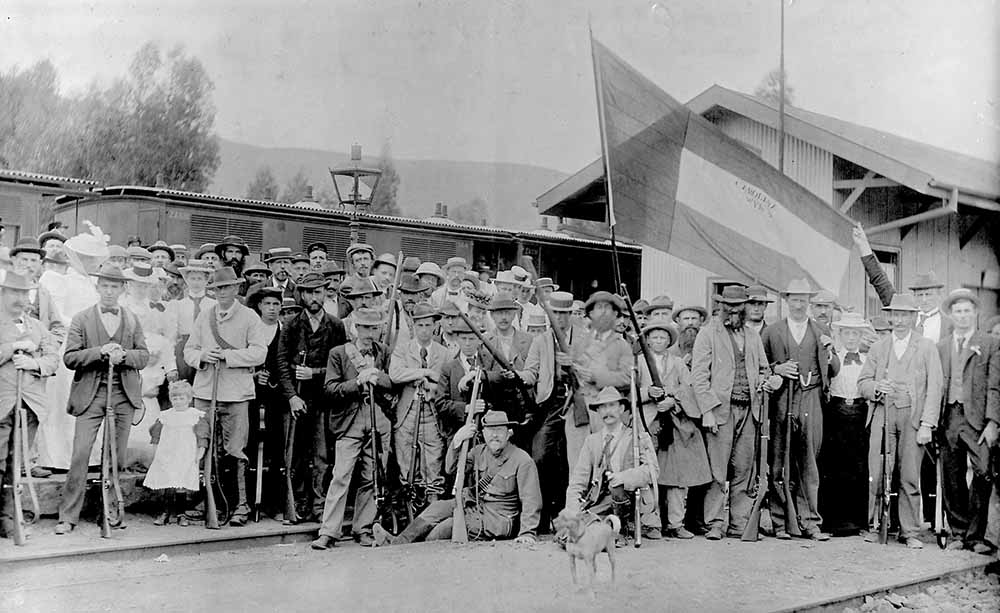
The Carolina Commando, established in 1895, with a flag.

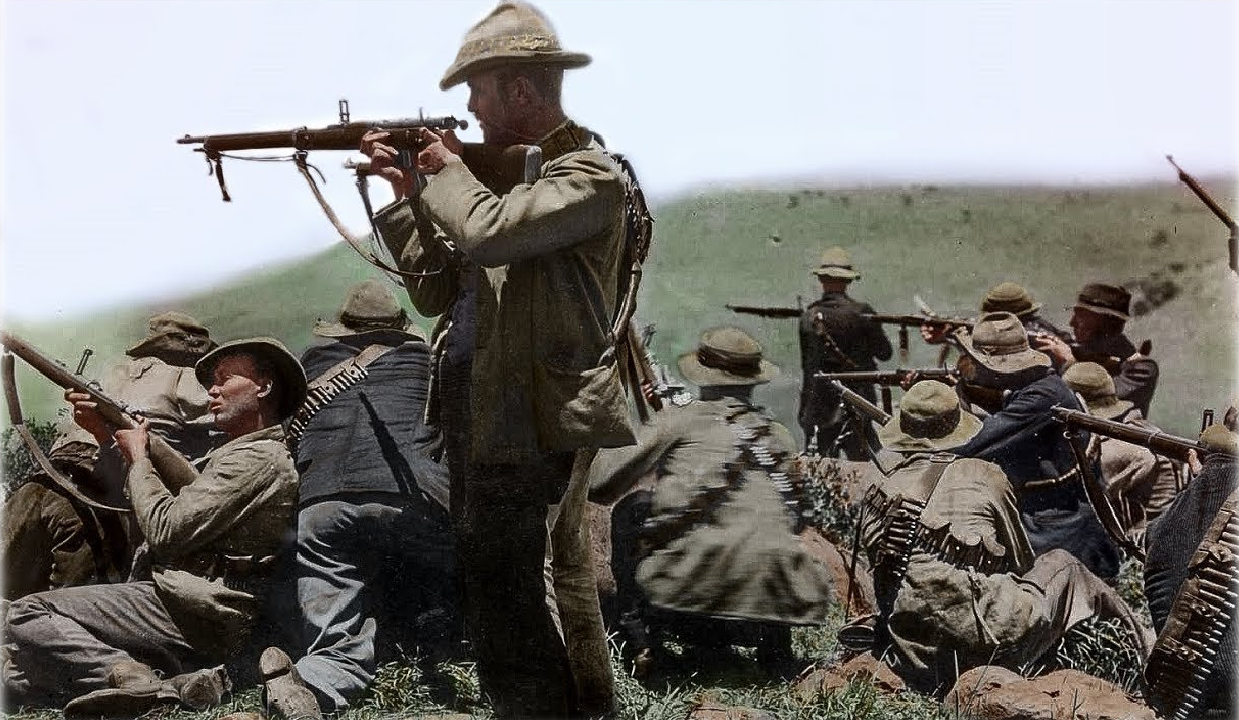
Boer Commando at the Battle of Colenso

Each commando was attached to a town, after which it was named (e.g. Bloemfontein Commando). Each town was responsible for a district, divided into wards. The commando was commanded by a kommandant and each ward by a veldkornet or field cornet (equivalent of a senior NCO rank)

The veldkornet was responsible not only for calling up the burghers, but also for policing his ward, collecting taxes, issuing firearms and other materiel in times of war. Theoretically, a ward was divided into corporalships. A corporalship was usually made up of about 20 burghers. Sometimes entire families (fathers, sons, uncles, cousins) filled a corporalship.

The veldkornet was responsible to the kommandant, who in turn was responsible to a general. In theory, a general was responsible for four commandos. He in turn was responsible to the commander-in-chief of the republic. In the Transvaal, the C-in-C was called the Commandant-General and in the Free State the Hoofdkommandant (Chief Commandant). The C-in-C was responsible to the president.

Other auxiliary ranks were created in war time, such as vleiskorporaal ("meat corporal"), responsible for issuing rations.

The commando was made up of volunteers, all officers were appointed, usually by election, by the members of the commando, and not by the government. This gave a chance for some notably talented commanders to appear, such as General Jan Smuts, General Koos de la Rey and General C. R. de Wet, but also had the disadvantage of sometimes putting inept commanders in charge. Discipline was also a problem, as there was no real way of enforcing it.

The various Boer republics did not all have the same command structure.

== Weaponry ==
Before the Second Boer War, the republics' most popular rifle was the .450 Westley Richards, a falling-block, single-action, breech-loading model rifle, with accuracy up to 600 yards. Some were marked "Made Specially For Z.A.R.". These were similar to the Martini-Henry Mark II rifles used by British troops. A book about the war (J. Lehmann's The First Boer War, 1972) offered this comment about the Boers' rifle: "Employing chiefly the very fine breech-loading Westley Richards - calibre 45; paper cartridge; percussion-cap replaced on the nipple manually - they made it exceedingly dangerous for the British to expose themselves on the skyline". During the First Boer War some older Boers preferred the duel purposed percussion cap breechloading Monkey Tail, also made by Westley Richards.

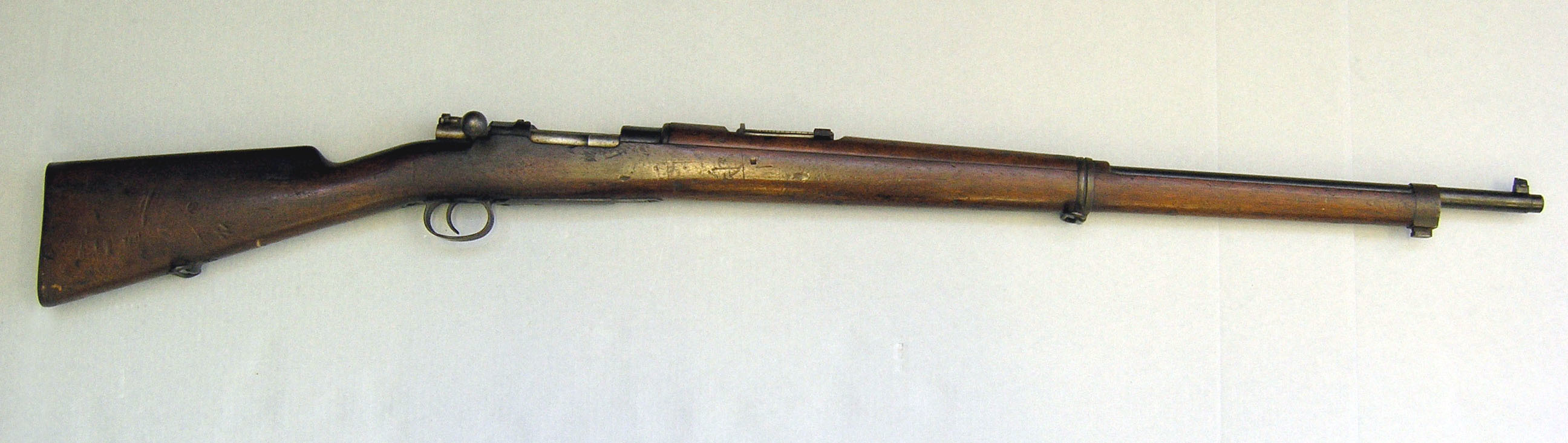
Mauser 1895 bolt action rifle (at the Auckland Museum)

For the Anglo-Boereoorlog ("Anglo-Boer War"), Paul Kruger, President of the South African Republic, re-equipped the army, importing 37,000 of the latest Mauser Model 1895 rifles and some 40 to 50 million rounds of 7x57 ammunition. The Model 1895 was also known as "Boer Model" Mauser and was marked “O.V.S” (Oranje Vrij Staat) just above the serial number. This German-made rifle had a firing range exceeding 2,000 yards. Experienced shooters could achieve excellent long-range accuracy. Some commandos used the Martini-Henry Mark III, since thousands of these had also been purchased; the drawback was the large puff of white smoke after firing which gave away the shooter's position.

Roughly 7,000 Portuguese Guedes 1885 rifles were also purchased a few years earlier and these were used during the hostilities.

Others used captured British rifles such as the "long" Lee-Metford and the Enfield, as confirmed by photographs from the era. When the ammunition for the Mausers ran out, the Boers relied primarily on the captured Lee-Metfords.

Regardless of the rifle, few of the commando used bayonets.

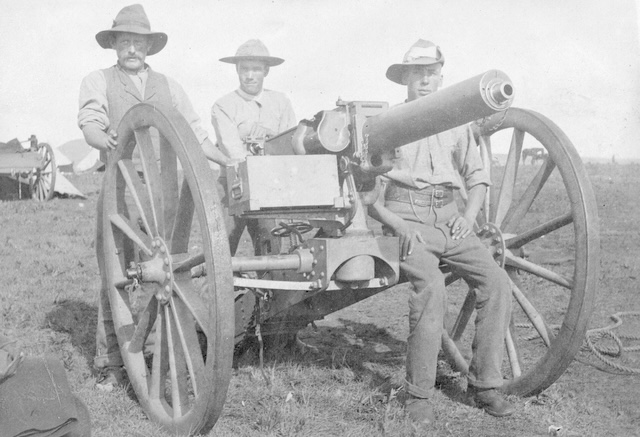
Australian troops with a QF 1-pounder Maxim auto cannon captured from the Boers, circa 1901

The best modern European artillery was also purchased. By October 1899 the Transvaal State Artillery had 73 heavy guns, including four 155 mm Creusot fortress guns and 25 of the 37 mm Maxim Nordenfeldt guns. The Boers' Maxim, larger than the Maxim model used by the British, was a large caliber, belt-fed, water-cooled "auto cannon" that fired explosive rounds (smokeless ammunition) at 450 rounds per minute; it became known as the "Pom Pom".

Other weapons in use included:

- Mauser C96 pistol
- Colt Single Action Army revolver
- Remington Model 1875 revolver
- Remington Rolling Block rifle
- Winchester rifle
- Vetterli rifle
- Gewehr 1888
- Krag–Jørgensen rifle
- Kropatschek rifle
- Lee–Enfield
- Lee–Metford
- Martini–Henry
- Guedes Rifle
- Enfield revolver
- Mauser Zig-Zag
- M1879 Reichsrevolver

== List of Boer Commando units ==
The following Boer commandos existed in the Orange Free State and Transvaal:

=== Orange Free State ===
- Bethlehem
- Bethulie
- Bloemfontein
- Boshof
- Bothaville
- Brandfort
- Caledon River
- Edenburg
- Fauresmith
- Ficksburg
- Frankfort
- Harrismith
- Heilbron
- Hoopstad
- Jacobsdal
- Kroonstad
- Ladybrand
- Lindley
- Parys
- Philippolis
- Rouxville
- Senekal
- Smithfield
- Thaba Nchu
- Ventersburg
- Vrede
- Vredefort
- Wepener
- Winburg

=== Transvaal ===
- Amsterdam
- Bethal
- Bloemhof
- Boksburg
- Carolina
- Christiana
- Elandsfontein
- Elands River
- Ermelo
- Fordsburg
- Germiston
- Heidelberg
- Jeppestown
- Johannesburg
- Klerksdorp
- Krugersdorp
- Lichtenburg
- Lydenburg
- Marico
- Middelburg
- Piet Retief
- Potchefstroom
- Pretoria
- Rustenburg
- Standerton
- Swaziland
- Utrecht
- Vryheid
- Wakkerstroom
- Waterberg
- Wolmaransstad
- Zoutpansberg
- Zwartruggens

== Notable commando leaders ==
=== Burgher commando leaders ===
- Andries Stockenstrom, served in the 4th, 5th, 6th, and 7th Cape Frontier Wars in various rank and leadership positions.
- John Charles Molteno, 7th Cape Frontier War, appointed commandant and would become the first Prime Minister of the Cape Colony.

=== Second Boer War leaders ===
- Koos de la Rey, was the commander of the western Transvaal commando.
- Christaan R. de Wet, elected Vice-Commandant of the Heilbron commando.
- Jan Smuts, served as second in command to General J. H. (Koos) de la Rey, would go on to become Prime Minister of South Africa and a field marshal for Britain in World War II.

== See also ==
- Commando
- Kommando
- Military history of South Africa
- Mounted infantry
- South African Commando System
- First Boer War
- Second Boer War
- Xhosa Wars
- Transvaal Civil War

== References and notes ==
=== Sources ===
- Wessels, André (2000). "Afrikaners at War". In Gooch, John (ed.). The Boer War: Direction, Experience and Image. London: Cass.
- Bester, Ron (1994). Boer Rifles and Carbines of the Anglo–Boer War. Bloemfontein: War Museum of the Boer Republics. ISBN 1874979022.
