= List of Second Boer War weapons =

This is a list of weapons used during the Second Boer War.

== British Empire and colonial troops ==
=== Small arms ===
==== Rifles ====
- Magazine Lee–Enfield Mk I
- Lee–Metford
- Lee-Speed

==== Handguns ====
- Webley Revolver
- Enfield revolver
- Colt New Service (used by Canadian officers)

==== Machine guns ====
- Maxim gun
- M1895 Colt–Browning machine gun

==== Artillery ====
- QF 1-pounder pom-pom
- QF 12-pounder 8 cwt gun
- BL 15-pounder gun
- BL 5-inch howitzer
- BL 6-inch 30 cwt howitzer

== Boers ==
=== Small arms ===
==== Rifles ====
===== Bolt action rifles =====
- Mauser Model 1893
- Mauser Model 1895 (also known as the "Boer Model" Mauser)
- Mannlicher M1888
- Mannlicher M1895
- Gewehr 1898
- Krag–Jørgensen
- Kropatschek rifle
- Model 1878 Vetterli
- Magazine Lee–Enfield Mk I (captured)
- Lee–Metford (captured)

===== Lever action rifles =====
- Spencer repeating rifle
- Winchester Model 1873
- Winchester Model 1876

===== Single shot rifles =====
- Fusil Gras mle 1874
- Guedes Rifle
- Martini–Henry
- Mauser Model 1871
- Milbank-Amsler conversion rifle
- Westley Richards Monkey Tail

==== Handguns ====
- Mauser C96
- Webley Revolver

==== Artillery ====
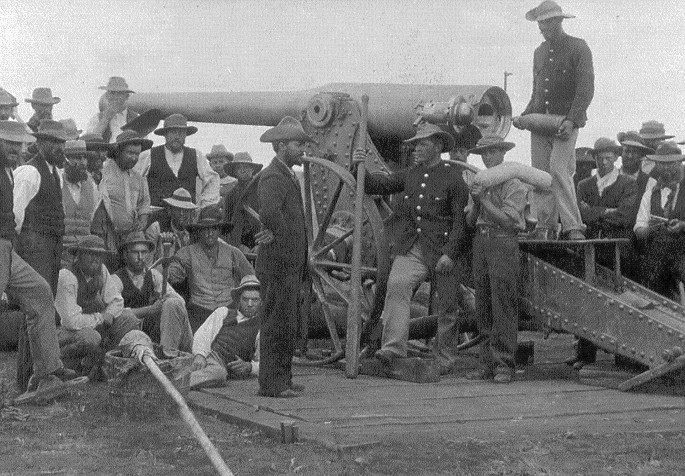
Boers loading a Creusot Long Tom during the Siege of Mafeking

- QF 1-pounder pom-pom (Boer variant mounted on a wheeled field gun carriage)
- 7.7 cm FK 96
- 120 mm howitzer Model 1901
- 155 mm Creusot Long Tom
