= Ficksburg Commando =

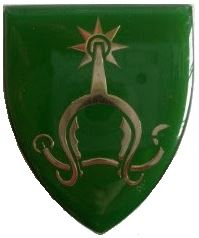
- Ficksburg Commando emblem
- Disbanded: March 14, 2003 (23 years ago)
- Country: South Africa
- Allegiance: Orange Free State Republic; Union of South Africa; Republic of South Africa; Republic of South Africa
- Branch: South African Army; South African Army
- Type: Infantry
- Role: Light Infantry
- Size: One Battalion
- Part of: South African Infantry Corps; Army Territorial Reserve
- Garrison/HQ: Ficksburg

Ficksburg Commando was a light infantry regiment of the South African Army. It formed part of the South African Army Infantry Formation as well as the South African Territorial Reserve.

== History ==
=== Origin ===
This commando can trace its origin to the Free State–Basotho Wars of 1858 -1868.

=== Operations ===
==== With the Orange Free State Republic ====
===== During the Anglo Boer War =====
The commando was again involved in the Anglo Boer War most notable being:

- Elements of this commando was engaged at the battle of Magersfontein on 11 December 1899.
- The Battle of Biddulphsberg in 1900.

====== Surrender ======
On the morning of 30 July 1900, General Hunter received the surrender of Commandants Prinsloo and Crowther of the Ficksburg Commando and the Ladybrand Commando. The surrender took place on what would become known as Surrender Hill in the Brandwater Basin.

==== With the UDF ====
By 1902 all Commando remnants were under British military control and disarmed.

By 1912, however previous Commando members could join shooting associations.

By 1940, such commandos were under control of the National Reserve of Volunteers.

These commandos were formally reactivated by 1948.

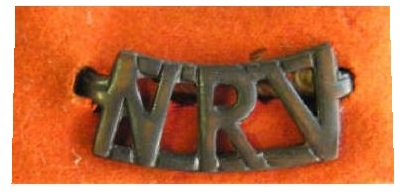
UDF era National Reserve of Volunteers shoulder tab

==== With the SADF ====
This commando was primarily used in this era for area force protection, border operations and stock theft control.

==== With the SANDF ====
===== Disbandment =====
This unit, along with all other Commando units was disbanded after a decision by South African President Thabo Mbeki to disband all Commando Units. The Commando system was phased out between 2003 and 2008 "because of the role it played in the apartheid era", according to the Minister of Safety and Security Charles Nqakula.

== Unit Insignia ==
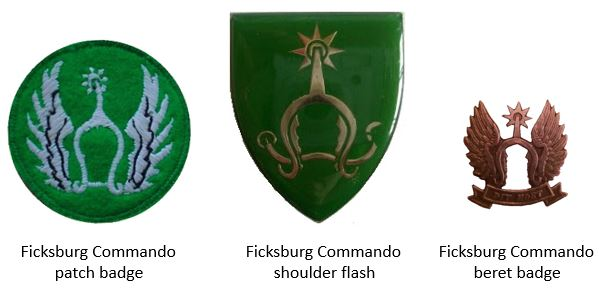
SADF era Ficksburg Commando insignia

== Leadership ==
Leadership
From	Honorary Colonels	To	Ribbon
	No known incumbents		
From	Commanding Officers	To	Ribbon
1900	Cmdt Paul de Villiers	nd	
From	Regimental Sergeants Major	To	Ribbon
	No known incumbents		

== See also ==
- South African Commando System
