= Benoni Commando =

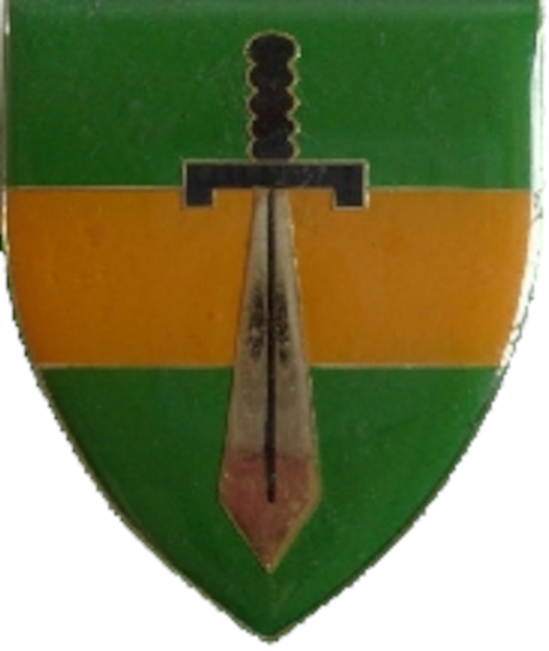
- Benoni Commando emblem
- Disbanded: February 14, 2003; 23 years ago
- Country: South Africa
- Allegiance: Republic of South Africa; Republic of South Africa
- Branch: South African Army; South African Army
- Type: Infantry
- Role: Light Infantry
- Size: One Battalion
- Part of: South African Infantry Corps; Army Territorial Reserve
- Garrison/HQ: Benoni, Gauteng

Benoni Commando was a light infantry regiment of the South African Army. It formed part of the South African Army Infantry Formation as well as the South African Territorial Reserve.

== History ==
=== Operations ===
==== Under the UDF ====
===== Rebel Commando =====
Members of the Benoni Commando sided with the strikers during the 1922 Miners Strike. At 05:00 on 12 March 1922, the Union Defence Force (UDF) attacked Benoni. The objective was to defeat striking commandos at a steel factory and then move into the rest of the town.

The Government forces commenced their attack at 11:00 and immediately came under heavy fire. The attack on the steel factory was supported by artillery fire from two positions, which contributed to the striker commandos being dislodged. The attack then continued along Main Reef Road.

Commandant. P. Botha and a portion of the Standerton East Commando joined the fight at 16:00.

The attack was called off at 17:00 in order to reorganize and consolidate positions before dark. Ammunition and arms arrived later that night and was distributed.

The reinforcements consisted of the rest of the Standerton East Commando, the Blesbokspruit Commando (Standerton), the Heidelberg Commando, the Hoogveld Commando (Heidelberg), the Roodekoppe Commando (Standerton), and the Standerton West Commando.

The attack continued on 13 March. The operation went according to plan and the besieged police and Permanent Force were relieved. An instruction was subsequently issued to arrest all male residents of Benoni.

==== Under the SADF ====
During this era, the unit was mainly engaged in area force protection, search and cordons as well as other assistance to the local police.

As an urban unit, this commando was also tasked with protecting strategic facilities as well as quelling township riots especially during the State of Emergency in the 1980s.

==== Under the SANDF ====
===== Disbandment =====
This unit, along with all other Commando units was disbanded after a decision by South African President Thabo Mbeki to disband all Commando Units. The Commando system was phased out between 2003 and 2008 "because of the role it played in the apartheid era", according to the Minister of Safety and Security Charles Nqakula.

== Unit Insignia ==
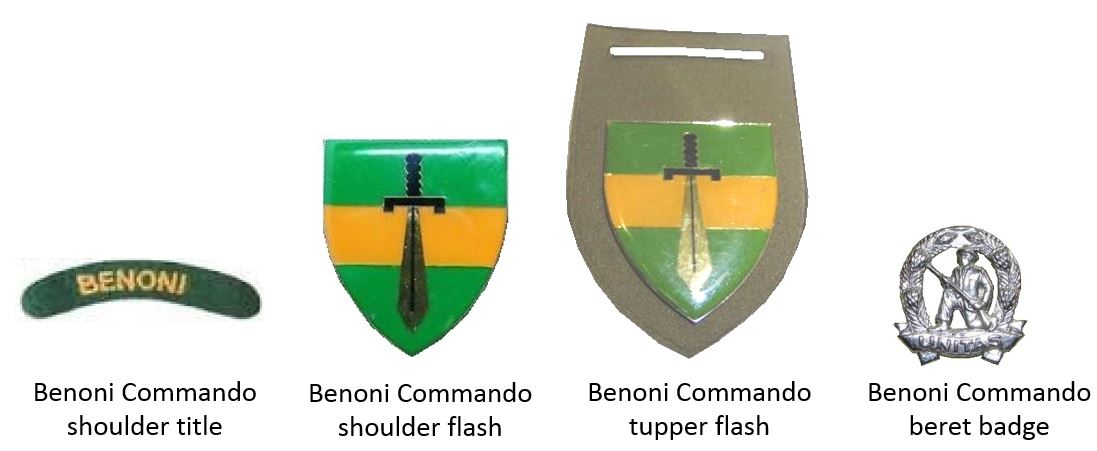
SADF era Benoni Commando insignia

== Leadership ==
The unit was commanded by Cmdt Marius Hattingh from 1963 to 1974 and thereafter from approximately 1978 by Cmdt Graeme Vollmer. Regimental Sergeant Major circa 1963 to 1970 was WO1 "Kokkie" Cochrane and after him WO1 Hennie Coetzer.

Leadership
From	Honorary Colonels	To	Ribbon
	No known incumbents		
From	Commanding Officer	To	Ribbon
1963	Cmdt Marius Hattingh	1974	
1978	Cmdt Graeme Vollmer	nd	
From	Regimental Sergeant Major	To	Ribbon
1963	WO1 "Kokkie" Cochrane	1970	
1970	WO1 Hennie Coetzer.	nd	

== See also ==
- South African Commando System
