= Johannes Joachim Alberts =

South African military officer during the Boer War and WWI (1872–1947)

Colonel Johannes Joachim Alberts DTD, CMG

Member of the House of Assembly
- In office 15 September 1910 – 20 October 1915
- Constituency: Standerton

Personal details
- Born: 8 June 1872 District of Pretoria, South African Republic
- Died: 23 April 1947 (aged 74) Ermelo, South Africa
- Party: Het Volk; South African Party
- Occupation: Farmer, commanding officer, politician
- Awards: Dekoratie voor Trouwe Dienst; 1914–15 Star; Companion (CMG)

Military service
- Allegiance: South African Republic; Union of South Africa
- Rank: Commandant; Colonel
- Unit: Standerton Commando
- Battles/wars: Second Boer War; World War I; Maritz rebellion; South-West Africa Campaign

Colonel Johannes Joachim Alberts, DTD, CMG (8 June 1872 – 23 April 1947) was a Boer commandant, officer in the Union Defence Force and politician.

== Early life ==
Alberts’ early years were spent on a farm near Pretoria before his family moved to Standerton, where he attended school and later became farmer.

== Second Boer War ==
When the Second Boer War started he joined the Standerton Commando as an ordinary burgher and was promoted field corporal in May 1900. The commando decided to lay down arms following the peace proclamations of Frederick Roberts, but Alberts refused and fled back to Standerton, where he supported the war efford and helped raise a new commando. In December, Alberts was appointed assistant field-cornet of the commando under the command of Comdt C. J. Brits. When Brits was promoted in June 1901, Alberts became a commandant of the Standerton Commando. He was one of the sixty delegates who attended the Treaty of Vereeniging and one of the six delegates who voted against it.

After the war, he returned to farming and remained a staunch follower of Lois Botha, playing a part in the establishing of Het Volk. In the 1910 election, he was elected to the House of Assembly for Standerton.

== World War I ==
When the Maritz rebellion broke out, he remained loyal to the government and lead the Bethal-Heidelberg Commando with the rank of colonel-commandant. After routing away the rebel commando under Comdt Izak Claasen at Treurfontein, he was promoted to colonel and took part in the pursuit of Gen. C. R. de Wet.

During the South-West Africa Campaign, he commanded the 2nd Brigade from 12 January to 4 August 1915. In March he encircled an enemy force of 9 officers and 200 men at Pforte. In May, he advanced on Otjimbingwe and together with the forces of F. E. Mentz captured Windhoek on 12 May.

== Later life ==
After the war, Alberts was appointed inspector of remounts and transport for the Union. He was senior sheep inspector for Eastern Transvaal until his retirement from public life in 1924. He continued farming until his death. He was survived by his wife, Catharina Susanna Gertruida Wessels, two daughters and one son.
