= Benoni =

Benoni may refer to:

== Places ==
- Benoni, Gauteng, a town in the Ekurhuleni Metropolitan Municipality, in the East Rand region of Gauteng province in South Africa
- Benoni, a barangay in Mahinog, Camiguin, Philippines

== People ==
- Benoni (given name), a list of people
- Giuseppe Benoni (1618–1684), Italian architect

== Other uses ==
- Benoni Premier United, a South African football club
- Benoni Commando, a former light infantry regiment of the South African Army
- Benoni Defense, a chess opening
- Benoni (novel), a 1908 novel by Knut Hamsun
- Benoni, original name of Benjamin, son of Jacob in the Bible

== See also ==
- St. Benoni, Nova Scotia, a community in Canada
- Benoni Rose House, a historic house in Rhode Island, United States
