= Standerton (House of Assembly of South Africa constituency) =

- Former constituency for the South African House of Assembly
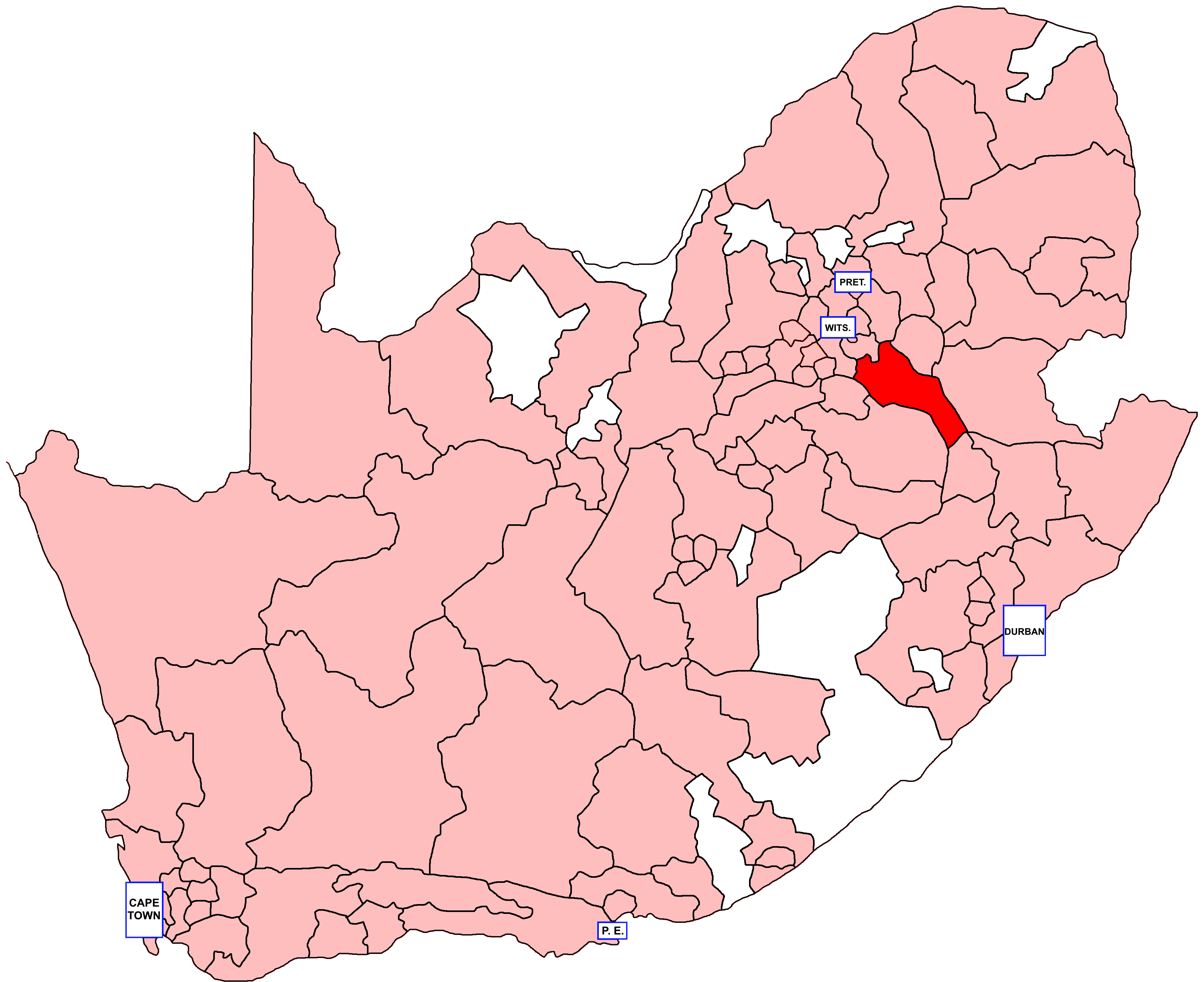
- Location of Standerton within South Africa (1981)
- Province: Transvaal
- Electorate: 21,538 (1989)

Former constituency
- Created: 1910
- Abolished: 1994
- Number of members: 1
- Last MHA: J. R. de Ville (CP)
- Replaced by: Mpumalanga

Standerton was a constituency in the Transvaal Province of South Africa, which existed from 1910 to 1994. It covered a rural area in the eastern Transvaal centred on the town of Standerton. Throughout its existence it elected one member to the House of Assembly and one to the Transvaal Provincial Council.

== Franchise notes ==
When the Union of South Africa was formed in 1910, the electoral qualifications in use in each pre-existing colony were kept in place. In the Transvaal Colony, and its predecessor the South African Republic, the vote was restricted to white men, and as such, elections in the Transvaal Province were held on a whites-only franchise from the beginning. The franchise was also restricted by property and education qualifications until the 1933 general election, following the passage of the Women's Enfranchisement Act, 1930 and the Franchise Laws Amendment Act, 1931. From then on, the franchise was given to all white citizens aged 21 or over. Non-whites remained disenfranchised until the end of apartheid and the introduction of universal suffrage in 1994.

== History ==
Standerton, like most of the rural Transvaal, had a largely Afrikaans-speaking electorate and was a conservative seat throughout its existence. Its most notable MP by far, Jan Smuts, was first elected in the seat in a 1924 by-election, precipitated by his loss in Pretoria West during the 1924 general election. Standerton MP Gert Marthinus Claassen agreed to step down to make his seat available for Smuts, and the latter would go on to represent Standerton longer than any other seat. However, his popularity fell after World War II, and amidst his United Party's nationwide defeat at the 1948 general election, he lost his own seat.

From 1948 on, Standerton was a safe seat for the governing National Party, who never went unopposed there but generally won strong majorities. In 1987, however, it was one of many Transvaal seats to fall to Andries Treurnicht's new Conservative Party, whose promise of maintaining unconditional white supremacy resonated with Standerton's white, largely Afrikaner electorate. Jacobus Rosier de Ville, the Conservative MP elected in 1987, continued to represent the seat until the end of apartheid.

== Members ==
Election	Member	Party
1910	Johannes Joachim Alberts	Het Volk
1915	G. M. Claassen	South African
1920	G. M. Claassen	South African
1921	G. M. Claassen	South African
1924	G. M. Claassen	South African
1924 by	Jan Smuts	South African
1929	Jan Smuts	South African
1933	Jan Smuts	South African
1934	Jan Smuts	United
1938	Jan Smuts	United
1943	Jan Smuts	United
1948	W. C. du Plessis	HNP
1953	W. C. du Plessis	National
1954 by	L. I. Coertze	National
1958	L. I. Coertze	National
1961	L. I. Coertze	National
1966	Hendrik Schoeman	National
1970	Hendrik Schoeman	National
1974	W. J. Hefer	National
1977	W. J. Hefer	National
1981	W. J. Hefer	National
1987	J. R. de Ville	Conservative
1989	J. R. de Ville	Conservative
1994	Constituency abolished	

== Detailed results ==
=== Elections in the 1910s ===
General election 1910: Standerton
Party	Candidate	Votes	%	±%
Het Volk	J. J. Alberts	Unopposed		
Het Volk win (new seat)				

General election 1915: Standerton
Party	Candidate	Votes	%	±%
South African	G. M. Claassen	Unopposed		
South African hold				

=== Elections in the 1920s ===
General election 1920: Standerton
Party	Candidate	Votes	%	±%
South African	G. M. Claassen	1,045	70.8	N/A
National	P. L. Erasmus	430	29.2	New
Majority		615	41.6	N/A
Turnout		1,475	51.7	N/A
South African hold		Swing	N/A	

General election 1921: Standerton
Party	Candidate	Votes	%	±%
South African	G. M. Claassen	1,215	68.1	−2.7
National	P. W. de W. Bekker	568	31.9	+2.7
Majority		615	36.2	−5.4
Turnout		1,783	55.5	+3.8
South African hold		Swing	-2.7	

General election 1924: Standerton
Party	Candidate	Votes	%	±%
South African	G. M. Claassen	1,273	57.0	−11.1
National	G. F. Kuun	950	42.5	+10.6
Rejected ballots		11	0.5	N/A
Majority		323	14.5	−21.7
Turnout		2,234	79.7	+24.2
South African hold		Swing	-10.9	

Standerton by-election, 1 July 1924
Party	Candidate	Votes	%	±%
South African	Jan Smuts	Unopposed		
South African hold				

General election 1929: Standerton
Party	Candidate	Votes	%	±%
South African	Jan Smuts	1,281	53.2	−3.8
National	Oswald Pirow	1,108	46.0	+3.5
Rejected ballots		20	0.8	+0.3
Majority		173	7.2	−7.3
Turnout		2,409	93.0	+13.3
South African hold		Swing	-3.7	

=== Elections in the 1930s ===
General election 1933: Standerton
Party	Candidate	Votes	%	±%
South African	Jan Smuts	Unopposed		
South African hold				

General election 1938: Standerton
Party	Candidate	Votes	%	±%
United	Jan Smuts	3,220	66.9	N/A
Independent	P. v.d. M. Martins	1,552	32.2	New
Rejected ballots		43	0.9	N/A
Majority		1,668	34.6	N/A
Turnout		4,815	87.0	N/A
United hold		Swing	N/A	
