= Wepener Commando =

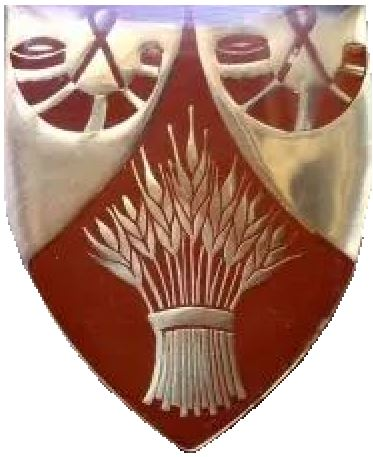
- Wepener Commando emblem
- Disbanded: March 14, 2003 (23 years ago)
- Country: South Africa
- Allegiance: Orange Free State Republic; Union of South Africa; Republic of South Africa; Republic of South Africa
- Branch: South African Army; South African Army
- Type: Infantry
- Role: Light Infantry
- Size: One Battalion
- Part of: South African Infantry Corps; Army Territorial Reserve
- Garrison/HQ: Wepener

Wepener Commando was a light infantry regiment of the South African Army. It formed part of the South African Army Infantry Formation as well as the South African Territorial Reserve.

== History ==
=== Origin ===
This commando was named in honour of Commandant Louw Wepener, a boer leader from the Basotho wars.

=== Operations ===
==== With the Orange Free State Republic ====
===== During the Anglo Boer War =====
The commando was involved in the Anglo Boer War most notable being:

- the Battle of Biddulphsberg in 1900.

==== With the UDF ====
By 1902 all Commando remnants were under British military control and disarmed.

By 1912, however previous Commando members could join shooting associations.

By 1940, such commandos were under control of the National Reserve of Volunteers.

These commandos were formally reactivated by 1948.

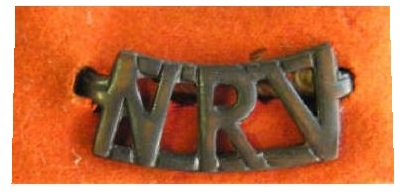
UDF era National Reserve of Volunteers shoulder tab

==== With the SADF ====
During this era, the commando was mainly used for area force protection, search and cordones as well as stock theft control assistance to the rural police.

The unit was also used for border protection with Lesotho.

==== With the SANDF ====
===== Disbandment =====
This unit, along with all other Commando units was disbanded after a decision by South African President Thabo Mbeki to disband all Commando Units. The Commando system was phased out between 2003 and 2008 "because of the role it played in the apartheid era", according to the Minister of Safety and Security Charles Nqakula.

== Leadership ==
Leadership
From	Honorary Colonels	To	Ribbon
	No known incumbents		
From	Commanding Officers	To	Ribbon
1900	Cmdt Paul Roux	nd	
From	Regimental Sergeants Major	To	Ribbon
	No known incumbents		

== See also ==
- South African Commando System
