= Bethal Commando =

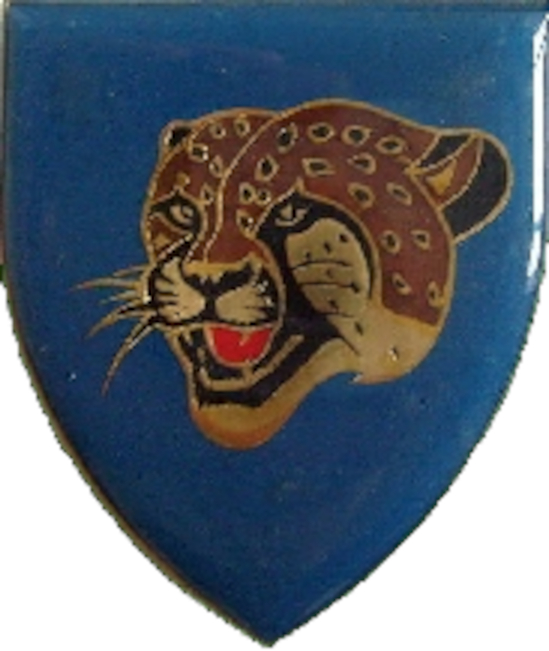
- Bethel Commando emblem
- Country: South Africa
- Allegiance: (South African Republic) Zuid Afrikaanse Republiek; Union of South Africa; Republic of South Africa; Republic of South Africa
- Branch: South African Army; South African Army
- Type: Infantry
- Role: Light Infantry
- Size: One Battalion
- Part of: South African Infantry Corps; Army Territorial Reserve
- Garrison/HQ: Bethal

Bethal Commando was a light infantry regiment of the South African Army. It formed part of the South African Army Infantry Formation as well as the South African Territorial Reserve.

== History ==
=== Origin ===
The Bethal Commando was originally established as a commando of the South African Republic (Transvaal)

=== Operations ===
==== With the Zuid Afrikaanse Republiek ====
The commando fought in the Second Boer War and was led by Commandant H.F. Grobler; it had an initial strength of 737. It fought at:

- Sandspruit
- Battle of Talana Hill
- Siege of Ladysmith
- Hlangwane
- Battle of Donkerhoek, in South Eastern Transvaal, and
- Battle of Bergendal.

==== With the UDF ====
By 1902 all Commando remnants were under British military control and disarmed. By 1912, however, previous Commando members could join shooting associations. By 1940, such commandos were under the control of the National Reserve of Volunteers.

These commandos were formally reactivated by 1948.

==== With the SADF ====
During this era, the unit was mainly used for rural area force protection, police assistance and stock theft control.

The unit resorted under the command of the SADF's Group 12.

==== With the SANDF ====
===== Disbandment =====
This unit, along with all other Commando units was disbanded after a decision by South African President Thabo Mbeki to disband all Commando Units. The Commando system was phased out between 2003 and 2008 "because of the role it played in the apartheid era", according to the Minister of Safety and Security Charles Nqakula.

== Unit Insignia ==
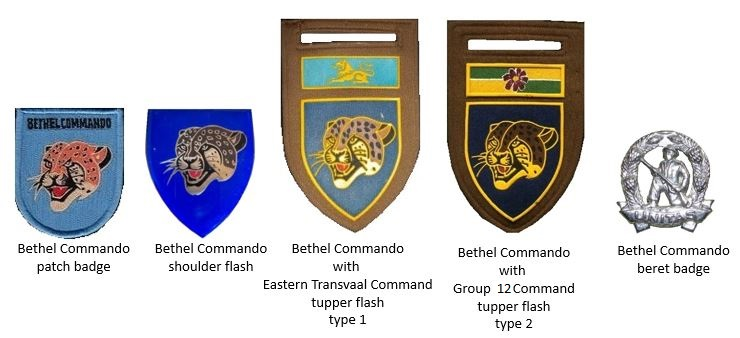
SADF era Bethel Commando insignia

== Leadership ==
Leadership
From	Honorary Colonels	To	Ribbon
	No known incumbents		
From	Commanding Officer	To	Ribbon
	No known incumbents		
From	Regimental Sergeant Major	To	Ribbon
	No known incumbents		

== See also ==
- South African Commando System
