= Boksburg Commando =

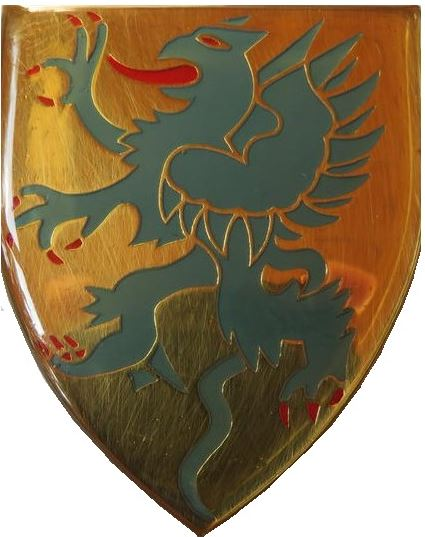
- Boksburg Commando emblem
- Founded: September 27, 1899 (126 years ago)
- Disbanded: February 14, 2003 (23 years ago)
- Country: South Africa
- Allegiance: (South African Republic) Zuid Afrikaanse Republiek; Union of South Africa; Republic of South Africa; Republic of South Africa
- Branch: South African Army; South African Army
- Type: Infantry
- Role: Light Infantry
- Size: One Battalion
- Part of: South African Infantry Corps; Army Territorial Reserve
- Garrison/HQ: Boksburg

Boksburg Commando was a light infantry regiment of the South African Army. It formed part of the South African Army Infantry Formation as well as the South African Territorial Reserve.

== History ==
The first Boksburg Commando was originally mobilised in 1899 and moved to the Transvaal border.

== Operations ==
=== With the Zuid Afrikaanse Republiek ===
When the Anglo Boer war was declared this commando crossed the border and occupied Newcastle in Natal.

Under Commandant A.J. Dercksen, the Commando had a combined strength of 2,013 with the Germiston and Johannesburg Commandos.

The commando fought at Sandspruit, Colenso, Hlangwane, Thukela, Pieter's Hill, Driefontein, Lang's Nek, Donkerhoek, Komati Poort, Renosterkop, Helvetia, and in North Eastern Transvaal.

Other operations in this era include:

- Battle of Elandslaagte (1899)
- Derailing of an armoured train near Colenso and capture of Winston Churchill
- Battle of Colenso (1899)
- Battle of Spion Kop (1900)
- Battle of Bergendal (1900)

=== Under the Union Defence Force ===
By 1902 all Commando remnants were under British military control and disarmed.

By 1912, however previous Commando members could join shooting associations.

By 1940, such commandos were under control of the National Reserve of Volunteers.

These commandos were formally reactivated by 1948.

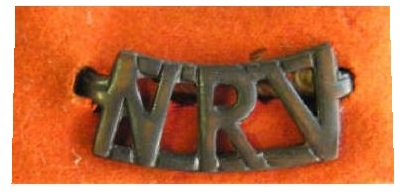
UDF era National Reserve of Volunteers shoulder tab

=== Rebellion Leaders ===
General C.F. Muller, a previous member of the Boksburg Commando, was one of the 1915 rebellion leaders.

=== Under the SADF ===
During this era, the unit was mainly engaged in area force protection, search and cordons as well as other assistance to the local police.

As an urban unit, this commando was also tasked with protecting strategic facilities as well as quelling township riots especially during the State of Emergency in the 1980s.

== Under the SANDF ==
=== Disbandment ===
This unit, along with all other Commando units was disbanded after a decision by South African President Thabo Mbeki to disband all Commando Units. The Commando system was phased out between 2003 and 2008 "because of the role it played in the apartheid era", according to the Minister of Safety and Security Charles Nqakula.

== Unit insignia ==
=== SADF-era insignia ===
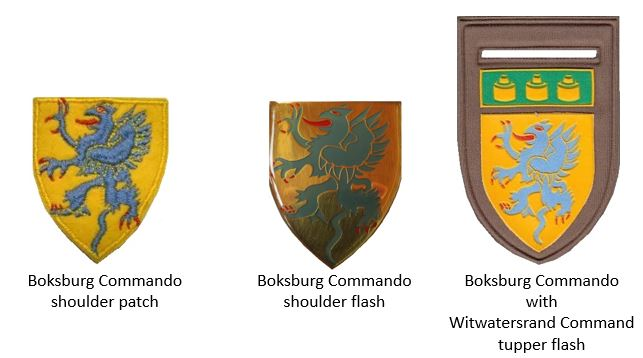
SADF era Boksburg Commando insignia

== Leadership ==
Leadership
From	Honorary Colonels	To	Ribbon
	No known incumbents		
From	Commanding Officers	To	Ribbon
1900	Field General G. Gravett	nd	
From	Regimental Sergeants Major	To	Ribbon
	No known incumbents		

== See also ==
- South African Commando System
