= Smithfield Commando =

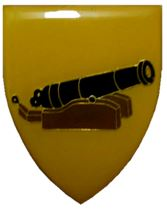
- Smithfield Commando emblem
- Disbanded: March 14, 2003 (23 years ago)
- Country: South Africa
- Allegiance: Orange River Sovereignty; Orange Free State Republic; Union of South Africa; Republic of South Africa; Republic of South Africa
- Branch: South African Army; South African Army
- Type: Infantry
- Role: Light Infantry
- Size: One Battalion
- Part of: South African Infantry Corps; Army Territorial Reserve
- Garrison/HQ: Smithfield Free State

Smithfield Commando was a light infantry regiment of the South African Army. It formed part of the South African Army Infantry Formation as well as the South African Territorial Reserve.

== History ==
=== Origin ===
==== With the Orange River Sovereignty ====
In 1858, Smithfield was a frontier town between the Sovereignty and the Basotho. It was therefore involved in the Basotho Wars and even could muster its own cannon called "old grietjie."

==== With the Orange Free State Republic ====
The commando was again involved in the Anglo Boer War most notable being:

- The Battle of Stormberg in 1899,
- The Battle of Biddulphsberg in 1900.

==== With the UDF ====
By 1902 all Commando remnants were under British military control and disarmed.

By 1912, however previous Commando members could join shooting associations.

By 1940, such commandos were under control of the National Reserve of Volunteers.

These commandos were formally reactivated by 1948.

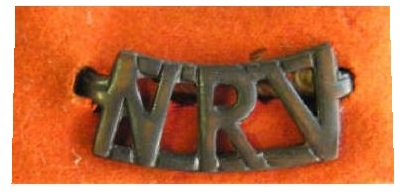
UDF era National Reserve of Volunteers shoulder tab

==== With the SADF ====
During this era, the unit was mainly used for area force protection, search and cordones and assisting the rural police in stock theft control.

==== With the SANDF ====
===== Disbandment =====
This unit, along with all other Commando units was disbanded after a decision by South African President Thabo Mbeki to disband all Commando Units. The Commando system was phased out between 2003 and 2008 "because of the role it played in the apartheid era", according to the Minister of Safety and Security Charles Nqakula.

== Unit Insignia ==
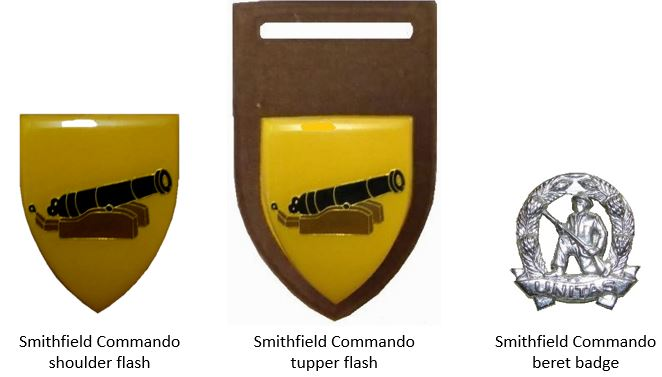
SADF era Smithfield Commando insignia based on the old grietjie cannon

== Leadership ==
Leadership
From	Honorary Colonels	To	Ribbon
	No known incumbents		
From	Commanding Officers	To	Ribbon
1899	Cmdt J Potgieter	nd	
1900	Cmdt Jan Le Roux Pieterse	nd	
From	Regimental Sergeants Major	To	Ribbon
	No known incumbents		

== See also ==
- South African Commando System
