= Guedes Rifle =

Portuguese breech-loading rifle

Guedes M1885
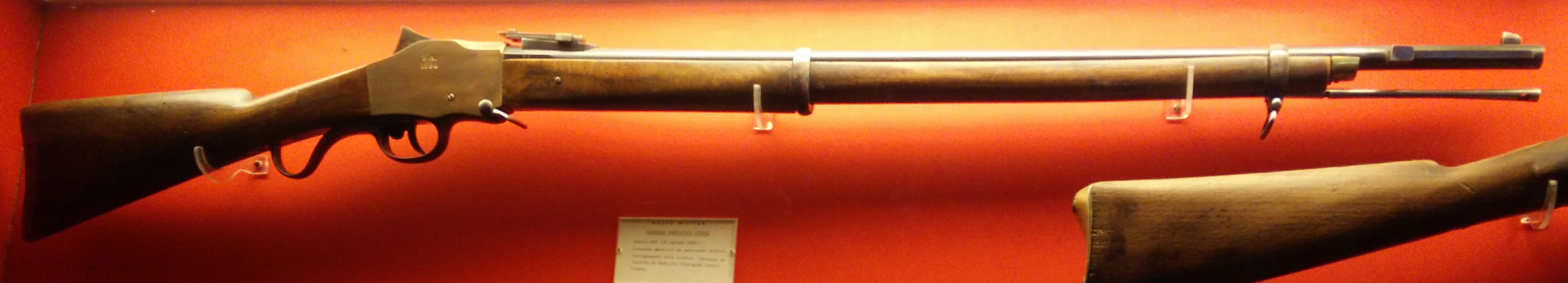
- A Guedes M1885 at the Lisbon Military Museum (Museu Militar de Lisboa)
- Type: Service Rifle
- Place of origin: Portugal; Austria-Hungary

Service history
- In service: 1885–1902
- Used by: See Users
- Wars: First Matabele War; Jameson Raid; Second Boer War; Maritz Rebellion (in small numbers)

Production history
- Designer: Luiz Fausto de Castro Guedes Dias
- Designed: 1880-1884
- Manufacturer: Österreichische Waffenfabriks-Gesellschaft (Steyr Arms)
- Developed from: Martini-Henry
- Produced: 1885-1886
- No. built: Approx. 18,000

Specifications
- Mass: 4,100 grams (4.1 kg)
- Length: 47.834 inches (1,215 mm)
- Barrel length: 31.88 inches (81 cm)
- Width: 1.377 inches (35 mm)
- Cartridge: 8x60mmR Guedes
- Action: Falling Block
- Rate of fire: 12 rounds/minute
- Muzzle velocity: 1,755 ft/s
- Effective firing range: 400 yd (370 m)
- Maximum firing range: 1749.781 yd (1,600 m)
- Feed system: Single-shot
- Sights: Sliding ramp rear sights, fixed-post front sights

The Guedes, also called the Guedes M1885 is a breech-loading single-shot rifle with a lever action that was designed for use by the Portuguese Army. Instead the Portuguese adopted the Kropatschek rifle rendering the Guedes obsolete. The Guedes rifle was sold en-masse to several of the Boer Republics and was heavily used during the Second Boer War.

== Overview ==
During the mid-late 19th-Century many European powers were designing and changing the format of their outdated percussion cap rifles to the newly developed self-contained metallic breechloading cartridge system. The Guedes rifle was invented by Luiz Fausto de Castro Guedes Dias, a Second lieutenant in the 10th “Caçadores” Regiment (10º Regimento de Caçadores) around 1880. The Guedes rifle is very similar in both design and operation as the Martini–Henry Mk II, its English counterpart. The Guedes rifle is chambered in 8x60mmR Guedes, a smaller, faster, and flatter caliber than the .577/450 Martini–Henry. The Guedes rifle was the first of its kind to implement a small caliber smokeless bottle-necked cartridge, beating the French Lebel Model 1886 rifle by only a few months.

Feedback on Guedes' rifle design was positive and he continued development on the breechloading rifle from 1882-1883. In 1884 Guedes was sent by the Portuguese War Ministry to study in Steyr and possibly have the rifle produced in Austria-Hungary. In February, 1885 Guedes tested his current rifle design at the Vendas Novas rifle range in the presence of an evaluation committee which approved of its design. In October, 1885 the Portuguese War Ministry ordered 9,000 of Guedes's carbines and 6,000 rifles for the Portuguese military on a contract with Österreichische Waffenfabriks-Gesellschaft (OEWG). The Guedes would ultimately be rejected by the Portuguese military as other countries were already adopting bolt-action rifles, rendering the single-shot Guedes rifle obsolete. The Portuguese military ultimately adopted the M1886 Kropatschek Rifle.

== Operation of the Guedes ==
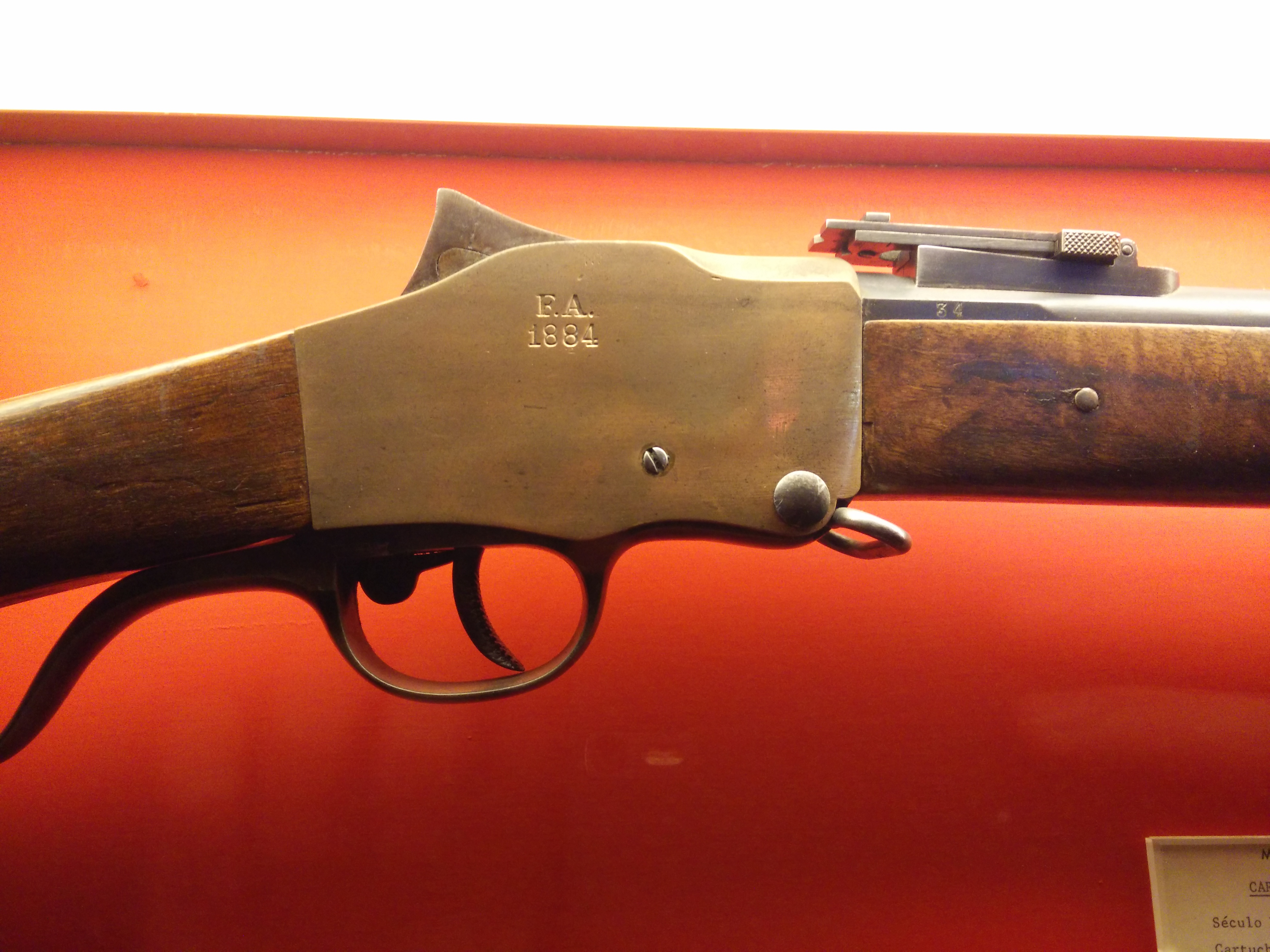
Close-up of the breech of the M1885 Guedes rifle.

The Guedes operates using a falling-block action, unlike the Martini-Henry the Guedes uses a shorter breech block which slides low enough for a cleaning rod to fit from the rear of the receiver. Inside the trigger guard the safety catch can be found and, when activated, locks the entire mechanism. Unlike the Martini-Henry, the Guedes has an ungraduated sight ramp which slopes forward, the rear sight itself having 5 notches of the sight ladder from 300 - 1,600 meters.

== Markings ==
Each of the Guedes rifles produced under the 18,000 contract by Steyer features the Portuguese royal cypher of Luís I of Portugal. One the left side of the receiver a smaller royal cipher stamp is also found. Later on, some Guedes rifles imported to the South African Republic were marked with the stamp "Z.A.R." on the top of the breech block of the receiver for Zuid-Afrikaansche Republiek.

== Use in the Boer Wars ==
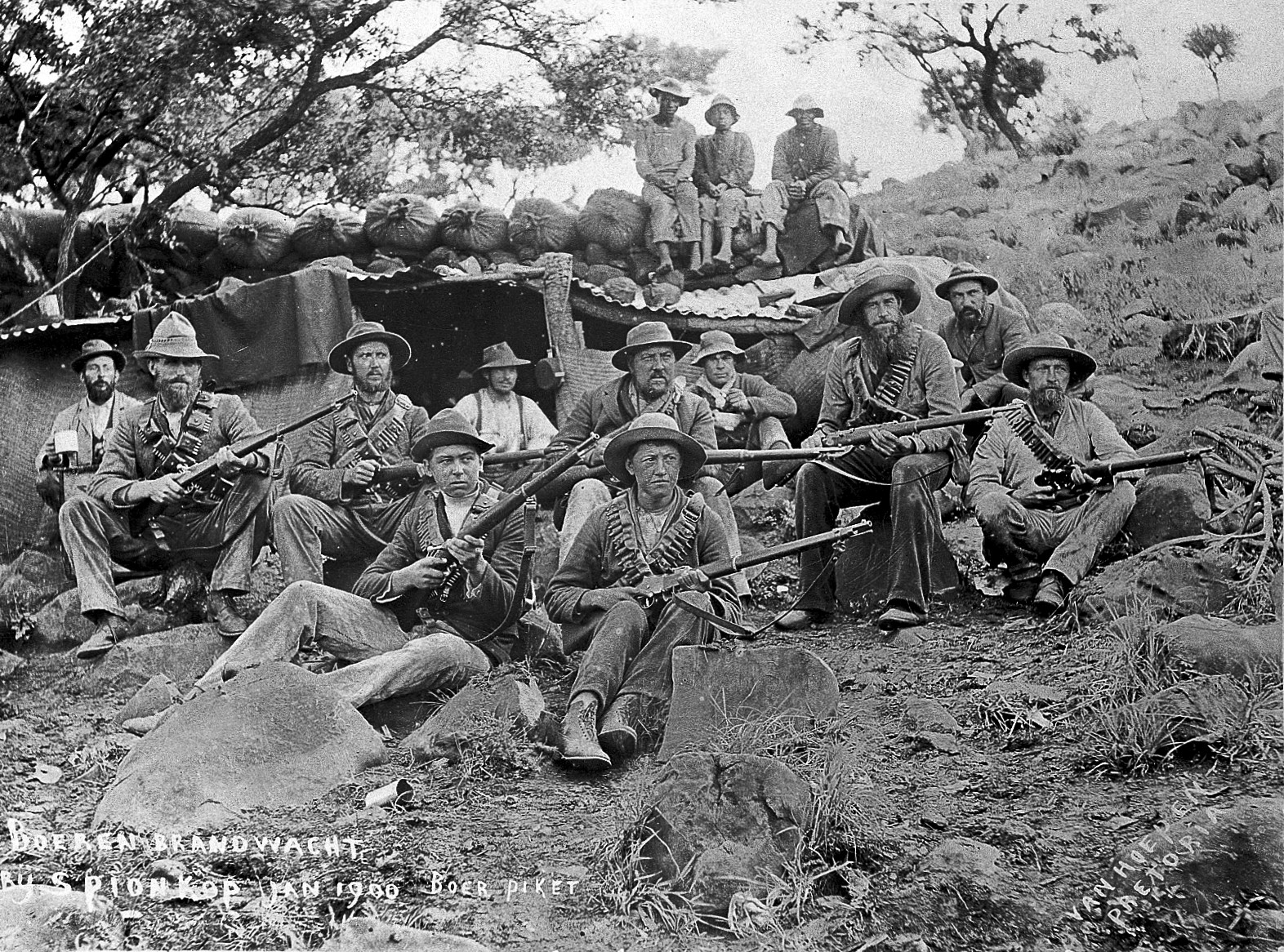
Boer commandos following the Battle of Spion Kop, January, 1900. The Boer in the front row (right) holds a Guedes rifle. Likewise, the Boer in the second row furthest right also wields an imported Guedes rifle.

Many Guedes rifles were exported from Portugal and sold to foreign countries, two of which were the South African Republic (ZAR) and the Orange Free State (OVS). In January, 1895 Boer General Ben Viljoen had decided to seek out modern armaments to replace the existing stocks of Martini–Henry rifles used by Boer commandos, the Vrystaatse Artillerie Regiment, and the Transvaalse Staatsartillerie. On August 16, 1893 Stein & Hunter, who were the South African agents for the Birmingham firm of Alfred Field & Company, purchased some 160 Guedes rifles along with 80,000 rounds of ammunition from Steyr Arms in order to present them to Boer General Piet Joubert and have them tested for use by the ZAR government. At the time Joubert was the Commandant-general of the ZAR. The Guedes rifles were to be tried and tested under Joubert from March to May, 1894 before the ZAR government committed to a larger purchase of arms. Because Joubert was placed in charge of testing the rifle, some Boers nicknamed the Guedes the "Joubert Rifle" (Afrikaans: Joubert Geweer). By the end of 1894 an order of 3,000 Guedes rifles was placed along with an order of 500,000 rounds of ammunition.

On July 20, 1895 Joubert ordered a further 2,500,000 Guedes cartridges. Before this transaction was even completed Stein & Hunter, a South African importer, offered Joubert a further 100 Guedes rifles at £3.12 a piece, Joubert accepted this order. In total, some 7,000 - 7,500 Guedes M1885 rifles were imported by Stein & Hunter to the ZAR by late 1895 shortly before the Jameson Raid. The Jameson Raid caused a widespread panic and was a wakeup call to Boer leadership to rearm and modernize its militia forces.

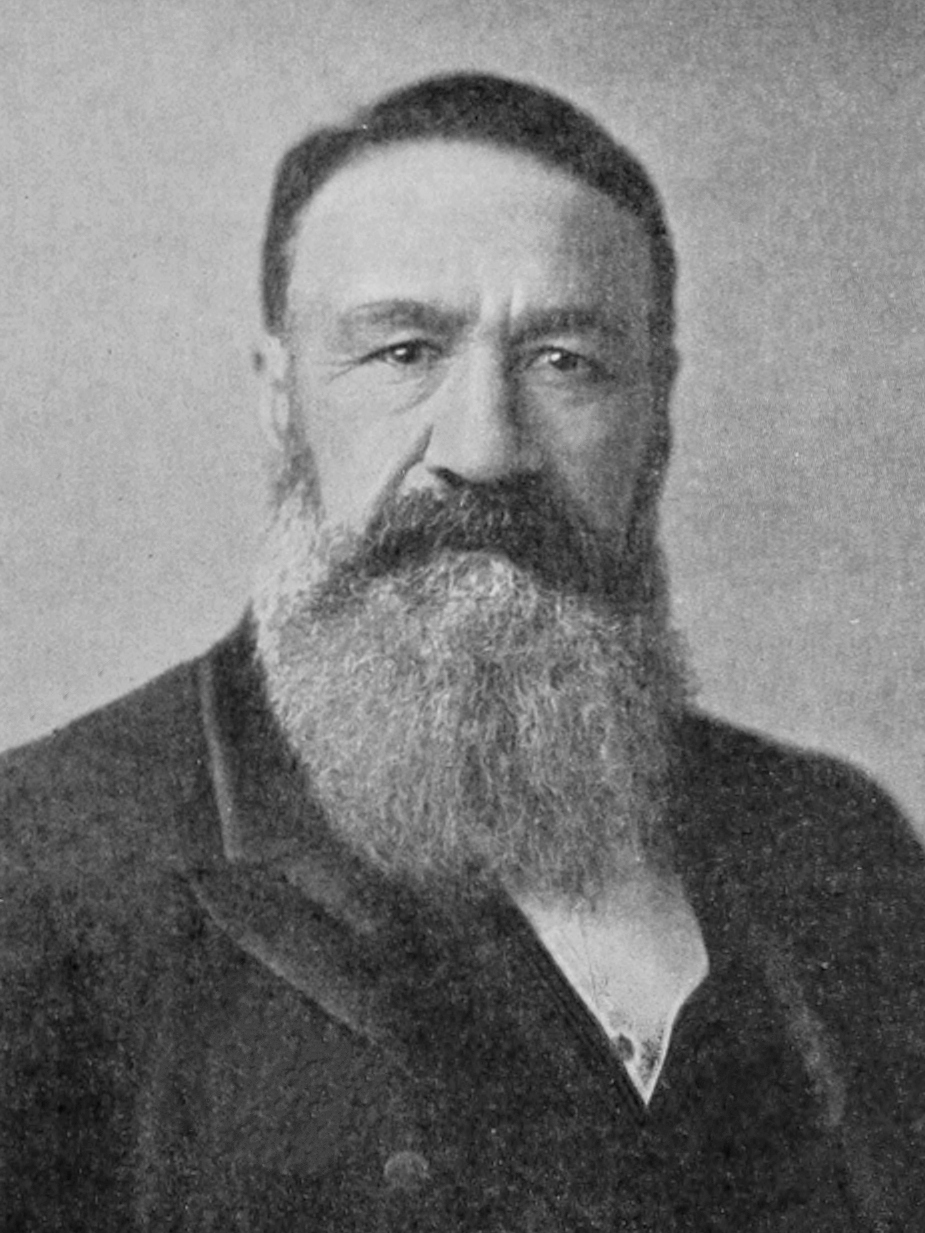
Boer General Piet Joubert favored the Portuguese Guedes rifle over the newer bolt action rifles after their trail period by the ZAR government.

The Boers affectionately nicknamed the Guedes rifle the "Giddy" rifle. The M1885 Guedes were used heavily during the Second Boer War, many of which were captured and later destroyed by British forces. Some Guedes rifles were taken home as war trophies by soldiers of the British Empire, many of which can be seen in multiple British museums, such as the Royal Armouries.

== Users ==
- South African Republic: Between 7,000 and 7,505 Guedes rifles were bought exclusively by the ZAR from Steyer via South African importers. The Guedes was a very popular rifle in the ZAR and saw extensive use by many Boers.
- Orange Free State: While the OVS did not directly purchase Guedes rifles from Steyer or other importers, nearly 1,400 Guedes rifles ended up in the hands of many OVS Burghers via the ZAR and via private purchase.

== See also ==
- Martini–Henry
- Martini–Enfield
- Martini Cadet
- Swinburn–Henry
- Piet Joubert
- Ben Viljoen
