= Piet Retief Commando =

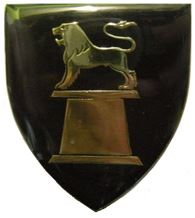
- Piet Retief Commando emblem
- Country: South Africa
- Allegiance: Republic of South Africa; Republic of South Africa
- Branch: South African Army; South African Army
- Type: Infantry
- Role: Light Infantry
- Size: One Battalion
- Part of: South African Infantry Corps; Army Territorial Reserve
- Garrison/HQ: Piet Retief, Mpumalanga

Piet Retief Commando was a light infantry regiment of the South African Army. It formed part of the South African Army Infantry Formation as well as the South African Territorial Reserve.

== History ==
=== Origin ===
This Commando has its origins prior to the Anglo Boer War protecting the community of Piet Retief from incursions from Swaziland.

=== Operations ===
==== With the Zuid Afrikaanse Republiek ====
Defence of the ZAR border February 1900: The task of defending the eastern line became the responsibility of General Lucas Meyer, with the Vryheid, Utrecht, Swaziland, Piet Retief, Johannesburg, Krugersdorp and Middelburg commandos under his command.

==== With the SADF ====
During this era the unit was mainly used for area force protection, cordon and searches, as well as stock theft control assistance to the local police.

The unit resorted under the command of Group 12.

==== With the SANDF ====
===== Disbandment =====
This unit, along with all other Commando units was disbanded after a decision by South African President Thabo Mbeki to disband all Commando Units. The Commando system was phased out between 2003 and 2008 "because of the role it played in the apartheid era", according to the Minister of Safety and Security Charles Nqakula.

== Leadership ==
Leadership
From	Honorary Colonel	To	Ribbon
	No known incumbents		
From	Officer Commanding	To	Ribbon
c. 1900	Cmdt Engelbrecht	c.	
c.	Cmdt Kohlmeyer	c.	
c.	Cmdt Hinze	c.	
c.	Cmdt Labushagne	c.	
c.	Cmdt Pretorius	c.	
c.	Cmdt Meulke	c.	
c.	Cmdt Johannes	c.	
c.	Maj Bruwer	c.	
c.	Maj van Wyk	c.	
c.	Lt Col Trebel	c.	

== See also ==
- South African Commando System
