= Parys Commando =

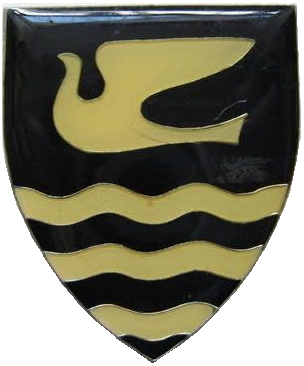
- Parys Commando emblem]
- Active: 1910-
- Country: South Africa
- Allegiance: Union of South Africa; Republic of South Africa; Republic of South Africa
- Branch: South African Army; South African Army
- Type: Infantry
- Role: Light Infantry
- Size: One Battalion
- Part of: South African Infantry Corps; Army Territorial Reserve
- Garrison/HQ: Parys

Parys Commando was a light infantry regiment of the South African Army. It formed part of the South African Army Infantry Formation as well as the South African Territorial Reserve.

== History ==
=== Origin ===
==== With the UDF ====
This unit can trace its history to before the Union of South Africa in 1910.

By 1902 all Commando remnants were under British military control and disarmed.

By 1912, however previous Commando members could join shooting associations.

By 1940, such commandos were under control of the National Reserve of Volunteers.

These commandos were formally reactivated by 1948.

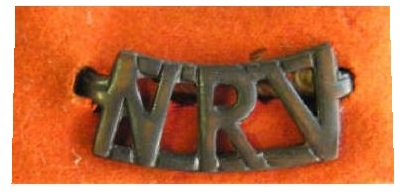
UDF era National Reserve of Volunteers shoulder tab

==== With the SADF ====
The commando was known as the Vredefort Commando up to 1967. This then changed to the North Free State Commando and this was finally changed in 1972 to the Parys Commando.

===== Freedom of the City =====
The unit received the Freedom of Parys in October 1980. At this function emphasis was laid on the protection of the town. The military donated an old Saxton tank to the unit in February 1985.

===== Higher Command =====
The unit fell under the command of Group 24 at Kroonstad.

===== Responsibility =====
The unit was responsible for the security of the farming areas around Parys and the nearby township Tumahole.

==== With the SANDF ====
===== Disbandment =====
This unit, along with all other Commando units was disbanded after a decision by South African President Thabo Mbeki to disband all Commando Units. The Commando system was phased out between 2003 and 2008 "because of the role it played in the apartheid era", according to the Minister of Safety and Security Charles Nqakula.

== Unit Insignia ==
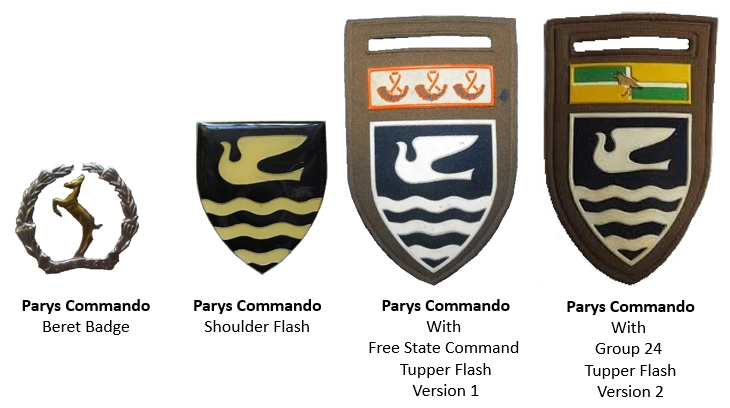
Parys Commando insignia

== See also ==
- South African Commando System
