= Lindley Commando =

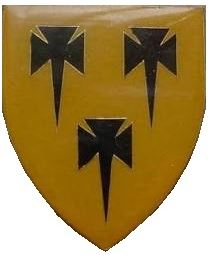
- Lindley Commando emblem
- Country: South Africa
- Allegiance: Orange Free State Republic; Union of South Africa; Republic of South Africa; Republic of South Africa
- Branch: South African Army; South African Army
- Type: Infantry
- Role: Light Infantry
- Size: One Battalion
- Part of: South African Infantry Corps; Army Territorial Reserve
- Garrison/HQ: Lindley, South Africa
- Motto(s): Wees Gereed, (Be Ready)

Lindley Commando was a light infantry regiment of the South African Army. It formed part of the South African Army Infantry Formation as well as the South African Territorial Reserve.

== History ==
=== Origins ===
==== With the Orange Free State Republic ====
This unit came into existence as an active Boer commando during the Anglo Boer War.

==== With the UDF ====
By 1902 all Commando remnants were under British military control and disarmed.

By 1912, however previous Commando members could join shooting associations.

By 1940, such commandos were under control of the National Reserve of Volunteers.

These commandos were formally reactivated by 1948.

==== With the SADF ====
During the era, the unit was mainly used for area force protect, search and cordones and assisting the rural police in stock theft control.

The unit resorted under the command of Group 24.

=== With the SANDF ===
==== Disbandment ====
This unit, along with all other Commando units was disbanded after a decision by South African President Thabo Mbeki to disband all Commando Units. The Commando system was phased out between 2003 and 2008 "because of the role it played in the apartheid era", according to the Minister of Safety and Security Charles Nqakula.

== Unit Insignia ==
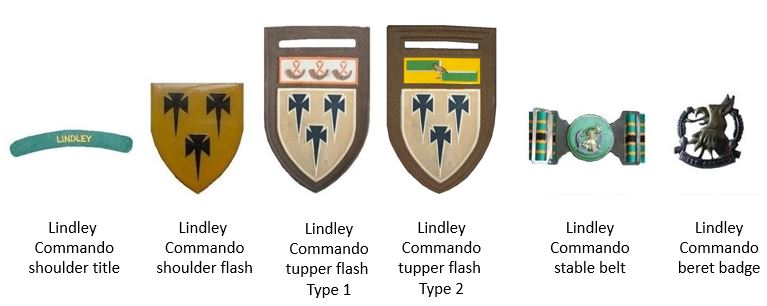
SADF era Lindley Commando insignia

== See also ==
- South African Commando System
