= 120 mm howitzer Model 1901 =

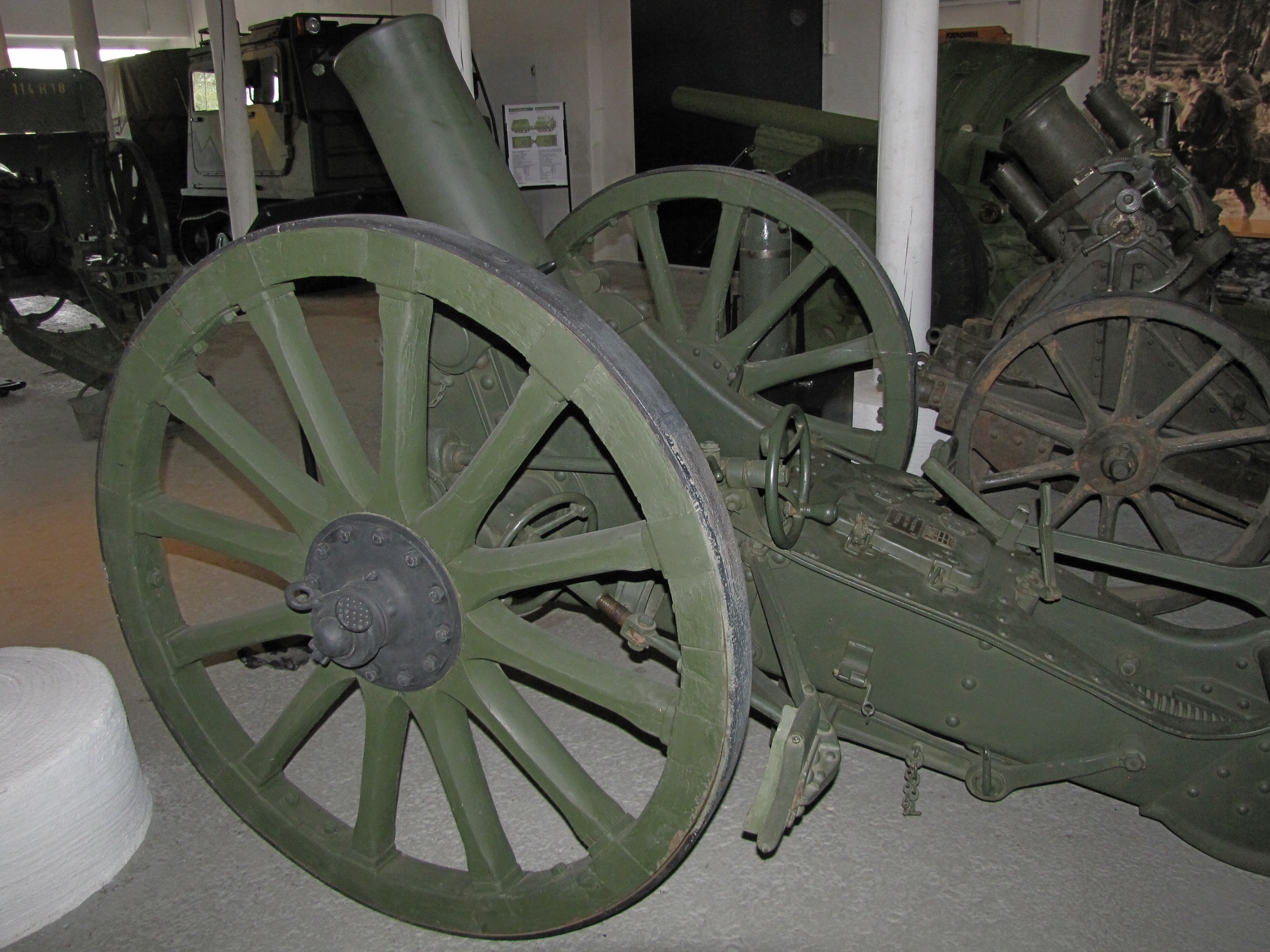
- A Russian model 1901 captured during the Finnish Civil War at the Hameenlinna artillery museum.
- Type: Howitzer
- Place of origin: German Empire

Service history
- In service: 1901-?
- Used by: See Users
- Wars: Second Boer War; Russo-Japanese War; Balkan Wars; World War I; Finnish Civil War; Hungarian–Romanian War

Production history
- Designer: Krupp
- Designed: 1901
- Manufacturer: Krupp
- Produced: 1901
- No. built: Russia: ? Romania: 31

Specifications
- Mass: Travel: 1,835 kg (4,045 lb); Combat: 1,065 kg (2,348 lb)
- Barrel length: 1.4 m (4 ft 7 in) L/11.6
- Shell: Cased separate-loading
- Shell weight: HE: 15.6 kg (34 lb 6 oz); Shrapnel: 21 kg (46 lb 5 oz)
- Caliber: 120 mm (4.7 in)
- Breech: Horizontal sliding block
- Recoil: Spring loaded recoil spade
- Carriage: Box trail
- Elevation: 0° to +42°
- Muzzle velocity: 300 m/s (980 ft/s)
- Effective firing range: 6.5 km (4 mi)

The 120 mm howitzer Model 1901 – was a German howitzer used by the Imperial Russian and Romanian Armies during the First World War.

== Design ==
The model 1901 was a short ranged field howitzer capable of both direct and indirect fire. The model 1901 had a short steel barrel, a box trail carriage, two wooden spoked wheels with steel rims, a horizontal sliding-block breech, it fired cased separate-loading ammunition and had a spring-loaded recoil spade. For transport, the trail of the carriage could be connected to a limber and caisson for towing by a six-horse team.

== Users ==
- Orange Free State – The Boers used an unknown number of model 1901 howitzers during the Second Boer War.
- Russian Empire – An unknown number of model 1901 howitzers were used by the Imperial Russian Army. The photos in the gallery below are of a model 1901 that was captured from the Russians during the Finnish Civil War and is displayed at the Hameenlina artillery museum.
- Romania – In 1902 two batteries of four guns were assigned to the 2nd artillery regiment in Bucharest. This was followed by three more batteries assigned to 1st, 2nd, and 3rd regiments. In 1915 the Romanians added a gun shield to protect the gunners. In 1916 the Romanian Army had 31 of these howitzers when they entered the First World War.

== Photo Gallery ==
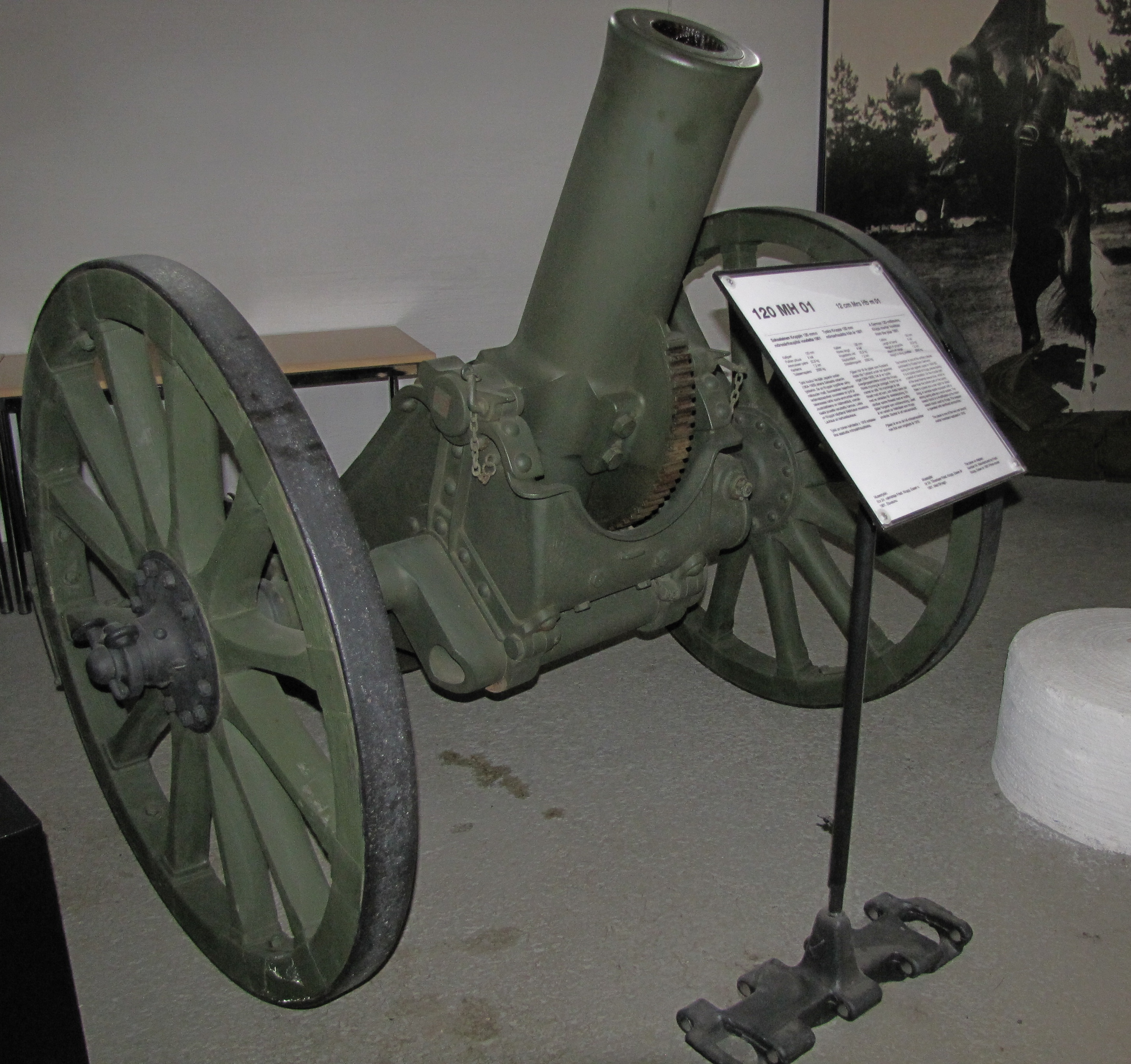

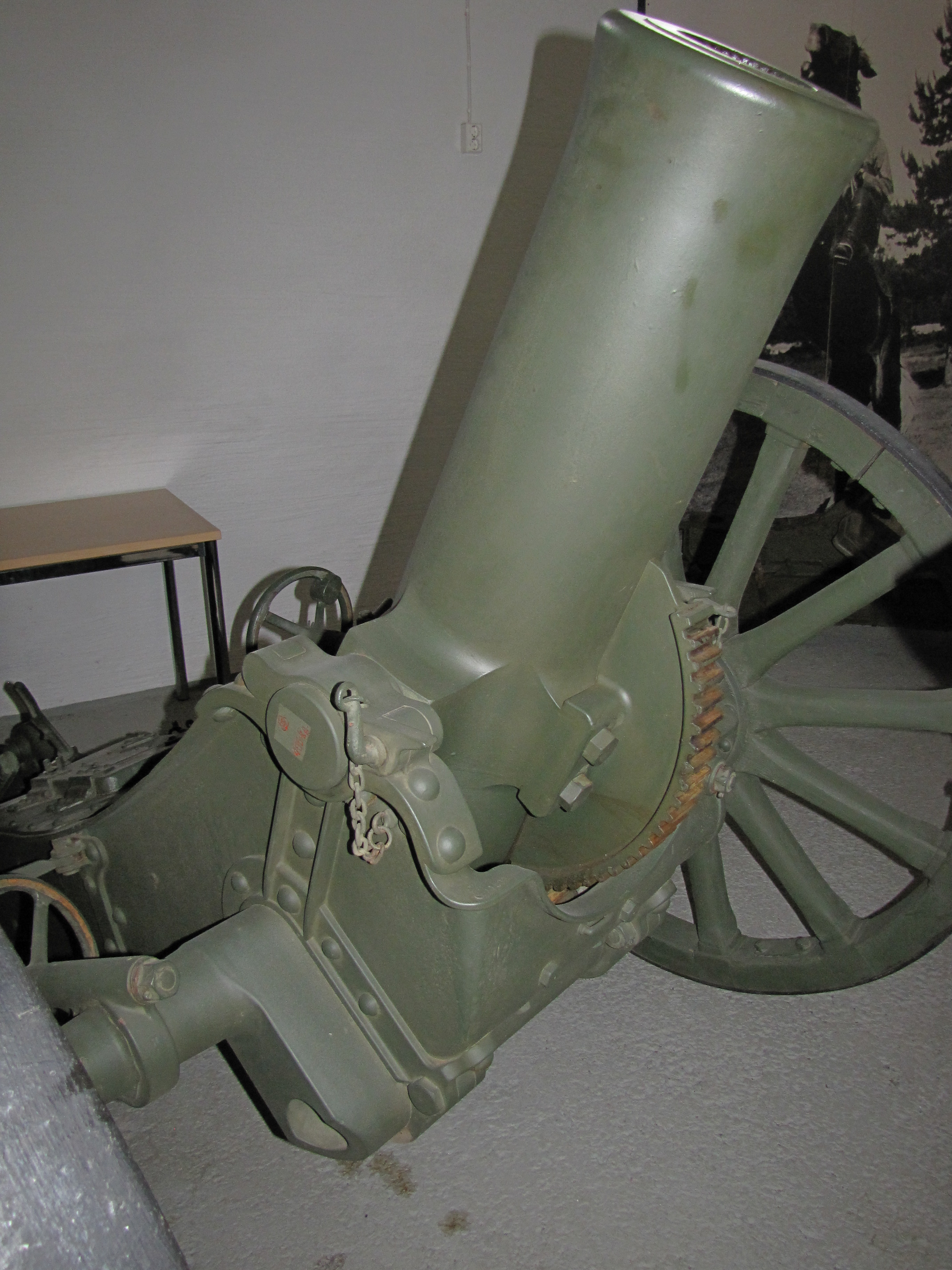

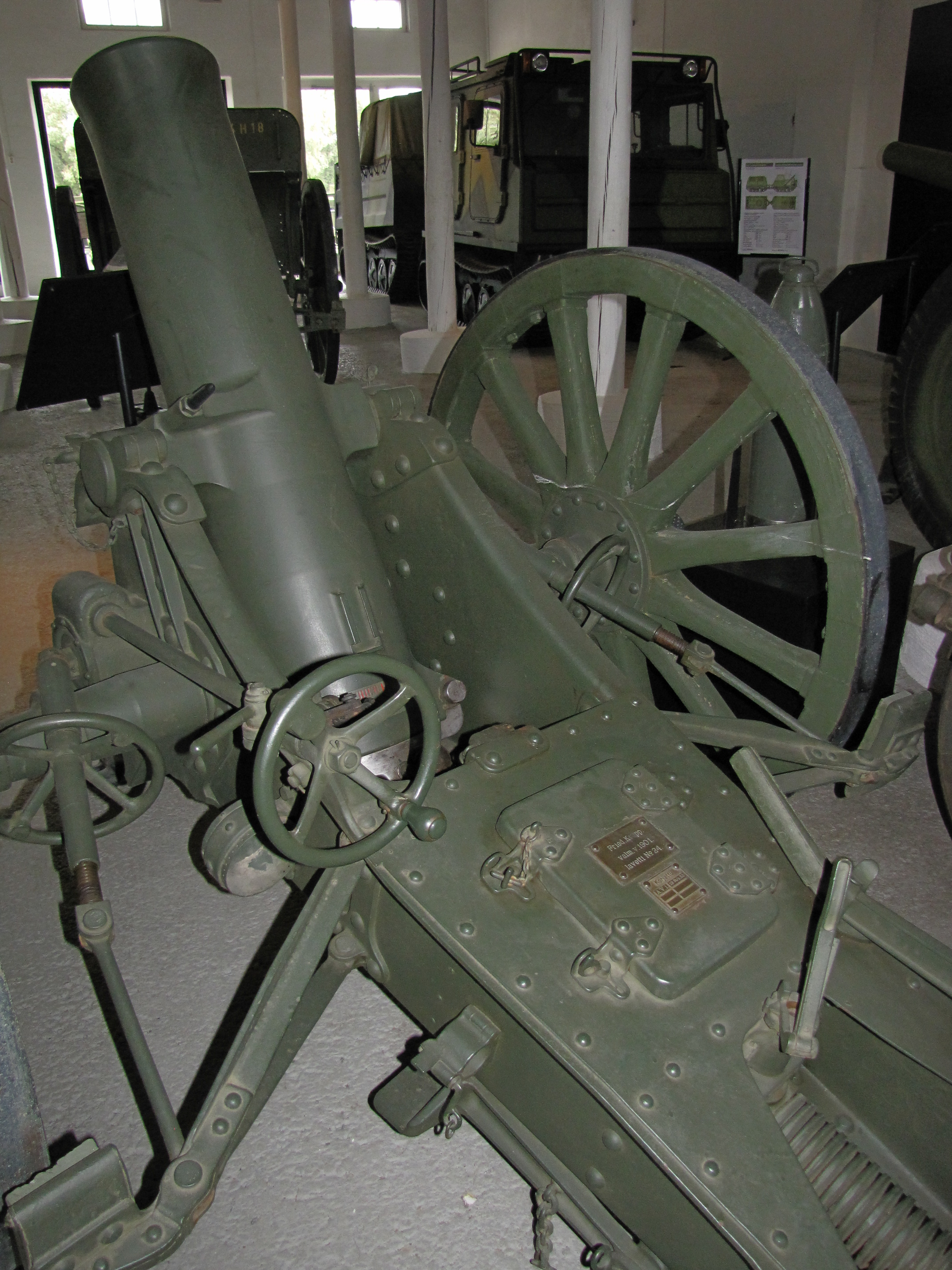
