= Heidelberg Commando =

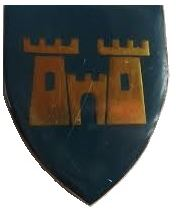
- Heidelberg Commando emblem
- Active: 1851-2005
- Country: South Africa
- Allegiance: (South African Republic) Zuid Afrikaanse Republiek; Union of South Africa; Republic of South Africa; Republic of South Africa
- Branch: South African Army; South African Army
- Type: Infantry
- Role: Light Infantry
- Size: One Battalion
- Part of: South African Infantry Corps; Army Territorial Reserve
- Garrison/HQ: Heidelberg, Gauteng
- Motto: "Pligsgetrou"

Heidelberg Commando was a light infantry regiment of the South African Army. It formed part of the South African Army Infantry Formation as well as the South African Territorial Reserve.

== History ==
=== Origin ===
Heidelberg Commando was formed in 1851 and was one of the oldest SADF units. One of its most iconic commanders was General Christiaan de Wet who farmed near Heidelberg.

=== Operations ===
==== With the Zuid Afrikaanse Republiek ====
During the Anglo Boer war this commando was known to have been commanded by a general at three different times. Heidelberg Commando served in the Natal Campaign and took part in the Battles of Modderspruit, Colenso, Platrand and Spioenkop.

By January 1902 the unit was forced in the Free State and joined up with Frankfort Commando.

The Commando was sent to assist the Free Staters at Paardeberg where General Piet Cronje and his laager was trapped. The Heidelbergers were then under the command of Commandant Cornelis Spruyt.

==== With the UDF ====
By 1902 all Commando remnants were under British military control and disarmed.

By 1912, however previous Commando members could join shooting associations.

By 1940, such commandos were under control of the National Reserve of Volunteers.

These commandos were formally reactivated by 1948.

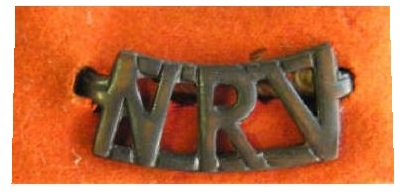
UDF era National Reserve of Volunteers shoulder tab

===== 1922 Miners Strike =====
At 05:00 on 12 March 1922, the Union Defence Force (UDF) attacked Benoni. The objectives was to defeat striking commandos at a steel factory and then move into the rest of the town. The Government forces commenced their attack at 11:00 and immediately came under heavy fire. The attack on the steel factory was supported by artillery fire from two positions, which contributed to the striker commandos being dislodged. The attack then continued along Main Reef Road. Commandant. P. Botha and a portion of the Standerton East Commando joined the fight at 16:00. The attack was called off at 17:00 in order to reorganize and consolidate positions before dark. Ammunition and arms arrived later that night and was distributed. The reinforcements consisted of the rest of the Standerton East Commando, the Blesbokspruit Commando (Standerton), the Heidelberg Commando, the Hoogveld Commando (Heidelberg), the Roodekoppe Commando (Standerton), and the Standerton West Commando. The attack continued on 13 March. The operation went according to plan and the besieged police and Permanent Force was relieved. An instruction was subsequently issued to arrest all male residents of Benoni.

==== With the SADF ====
During this era, the commando was mainly tasked with area force protection, search and cordones and stock theft control assistance to the local police.

===== Colours =====
On 8 September 1990 the unit was awarded a new colours by the General Officer Commanding Witwatersrand, Major General W.G. Kritzinger. A new regimental badge was worn for the first time. A castle surmounted by an eagle of the old South African republic to symbolize that at one time Heidelberg was the capital of the republic. The old badge of a "kranzitter" would no longer be used.

==== With the SANDF ====
===== Amalgamation =====
Nigel Commando amalgamated with Heidelberg Commando on 1 April 1997.

===== Disbandment =====
This unit, along with all other Commando units was disbanded after a decision by South African President Thabo Mbeki to disband all Commando Units. The Commando system was phased out between 2003 and 2008 "because of the role it played in the apartheid era", according to the Minister of Safety and Security Charles Nqakula.

== Unit insignia ==
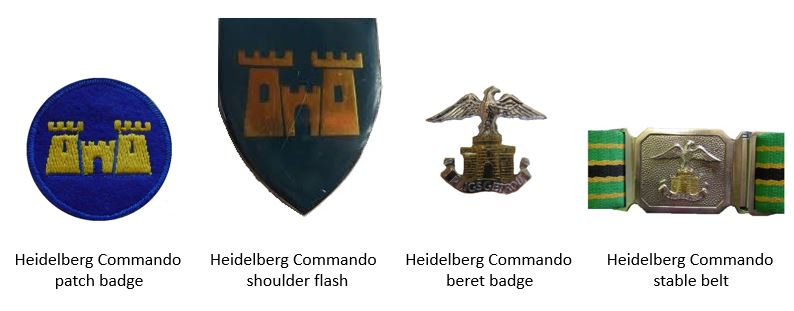
SADF era Heidelberg Commando insignia

== Leadership ==
Leadership
From	Honorary Colonels	To	Ribbon
	No known incumbents		
From	Commanding Officers	To	Ribbon
1899	Cmdt Breytenbach	nd	
1900	Cmdt J.D. Weilbach	nd	
1901	Cmdt C. Spruyt	nd	
1902	Cmdt H.J. Kamffer	nd	
1946	Cmdt C.C. Schabort	1956	
1956	Cmdt W.J.T. Read	1957	
1957	Cmdt S.B. Buys	1967	
1967	Cmdt J.H.P. Hattingh DWD	1976	
1976	Cmdt C.H.I. Boshoff DWD	1983	
1983	Cmdt N.J.J. Schoonbee	1988	
1988	Cmdt H.J.G. Kamffer	1998	
From	Regimental Sergeants Major	To	Ribbon
1956	AO1 C.J. Coetzee	1960	
1960	AO1 V.P. Botha	1965	
1965	AO1 L.J. Schutte	1980	
1980	AO1 W.J. Dreyer	1983	
1983	AO1 C.J.T. Botha	nd	

== See also ==
- South African Commando System
