= Ladybrand Commando =

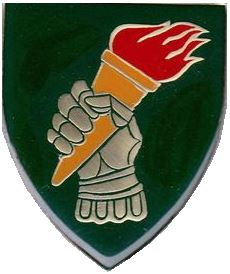
- Ladybrand Commando emblem
- Disbanded: March 14, 2003 (23 years ago)
- Country: South Africa
- Allegiance: Orange Free State Republic; Union of South Africa; Republic of South Africa; Republic of South Africa
- Branch: South African Army; South African Army
- Type: Infantry
- Role: Light Infantry
- Size: One Battalion
- Part of: South African Infantry Corps; Army Territorial Reserve, Group 36
- Garrison/HQ: Ladybrand

Ladybrand Commando was a light infantry regiment of the South African Army from Ladybrand, Orange Free State. It formed part of the South African Army Infantry Formation as well as the South African Territorial Reserve.

== History ==
=== Operations ===
==== With the Orange Free State Republic ====
===== During the Anglo Boer War =====
Elements of this commando were engaged at the battle of Magersfontein on 11 December 1899.

====== Surrender ======
On the morning of 30 July 1900, General Hunter received the surrender of Commandants Prinsloo and Crowther and of the Ficksburg and Ladybrand commandos. The surrender took place on what would become known as 'Surrender Hill in the Brandwater Basin.

==== With the UDF ====
By 1902 all Commando remnants were under British military control and disarmed.

By 1912, however previous Commando members could join shooting associations.

By 1940, such commandos were under control of the National Reserve of Volunteers.

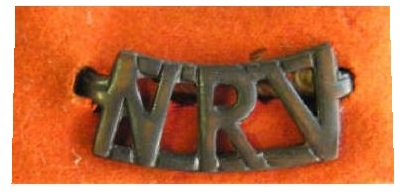
UDF era National Reserve of Volunteers shoulder tab

These commandos were formally reactivated by 1948.

==== With the SADF ====
During this era, the commando was mainly used for air force protection, cordon and search operations, as well as stock theft control assistance to the rural police.

The Commando was also involved in border protection with Lesotho.

The unit resorted under the command of the SADF's Group 36.

==== With the SANDF ====
===== Disbandment =====
This unit, along with all other Commando units was disbanded after a decision by South African President Thabo Mbeki to disband all Commando Units. The Commando system was phased out between 2003 and 2008 "because of the role it played in the apartheid era", according to the Minister of Safety and Security Charles Nqakula.

== Unit Insignia ==
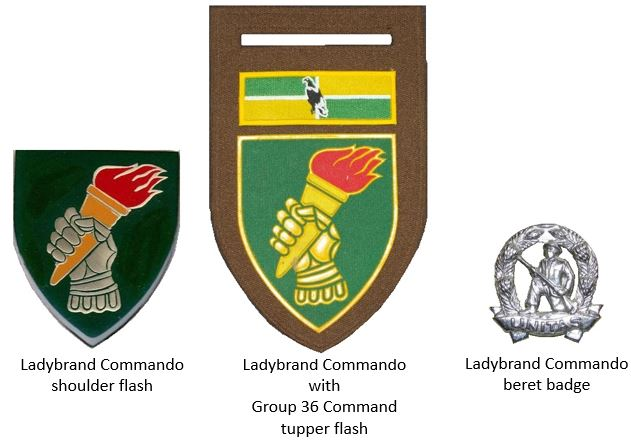
SADF era Ladybrand Commando insignia

== Leadership ==
Leadership
From	Honorary Colonels	To	Ribbon
	No known incumbents		
From	Commanding Officers	To	Ribbon
1900	Cmdt Jan Crowther	nd	
From	Regimental Sergeants Major	To	Ribbon
	No known incumbents		

== See also ==
- South African Commando System
