= Battle of Biddulphsberg =

Skirmish during the Second Boer War

- Part of the Second Boer War
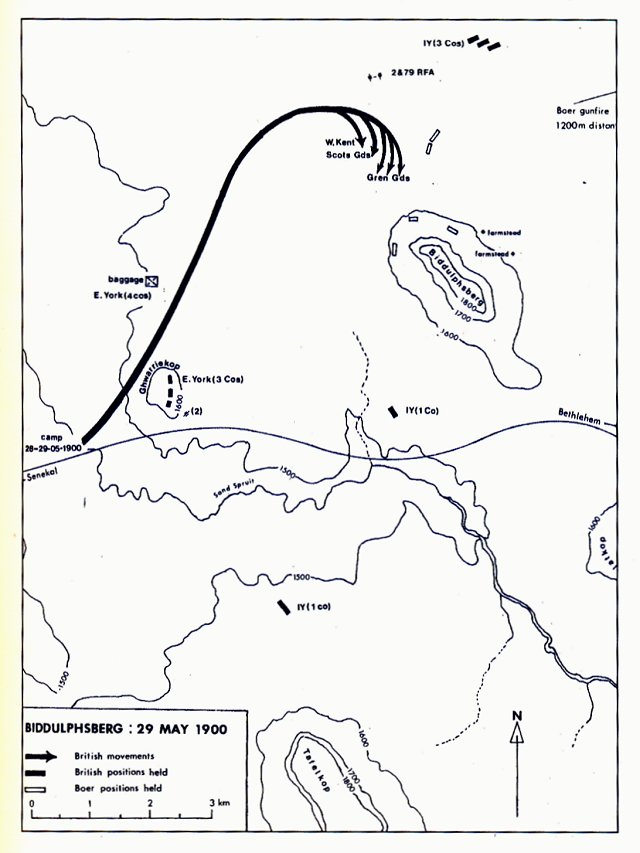
- Map of the battle
Date	29 May 1900
Location	Near Senekal, South Africa 28°16′39.5″S 27°45′41.3″E
Result	Boer victory

Belligerents
United Kingdom of Great Britain and Ireland	Orange Free State

Commanders and leaders
(United Kingdom of Great Britain and Ireland) Leslie Rundle	(Orange Free State) A. I. de Villiers

Strength
~4,000 men	400 Boers

The Battle of Biddulphsberg was an engagement of the Second Boer War on May 29, 1900, and was part of the Advance on Pretoria. Troops of the 8th Division were stationed in the Southern regions of the Orange Free State in order to cover Lord Roberts' advance on Transvaal, and to prevent the Orange Free State from falling back under Boer control. The British attempted to storm Biddulphsberg-kopje, which was defended by Boers of the Senekal Commando, however were unable to due to a fire that spread in the grass, forcing a retreat.
