= Orange Free State Command =

Command of the South African Army

- Bloemfontein, South Africa

Site information
- Type: Command (military formation)

Site history
- Events: 1933–1999

Orange Free State Command was a command of the South African Army, active from c. 1933 to c. 1999. Its headquarters was at Bloemfontein, seemingly for a period at the Tempe airfield, later to become the Tempe Military Base.

== History ==
=== Origin ===
==== Union Defence Force Military Districts ====
The command was originally Military District No. 4, formed in 1926. In 1933–1934 it became Orange Free State Command, and then may have become Central Command around 1939. The Officers commanding the new Commands were usually Brigadiers all units in those areas fell under them as far as training, housing, administration, discipline and counter insurgency were concerned.

Dan Pienaar served as officer commanding from 4 January 1935 to January 1937, before being transferred to take command of the Roberts' Heights and Transvaal Command at Voortrekkerhoogte which he commanded from 17 October 1938 to May 1940.

On 3 September 1939 the command included the 4th Infantry Brigade (including Regiment President Steyn, RLW, Regiment de Wet, and 4 Field Company SAEC, a pioneer battalion, and an artillery regiment, the Orange Free State Field Artillery (O.V.S. Veld Artillerie in Afrikaans). The OVSVA may have later become the Orange Free State Artillery, and later, in turn, 6 Field Regiment South African Artillery.

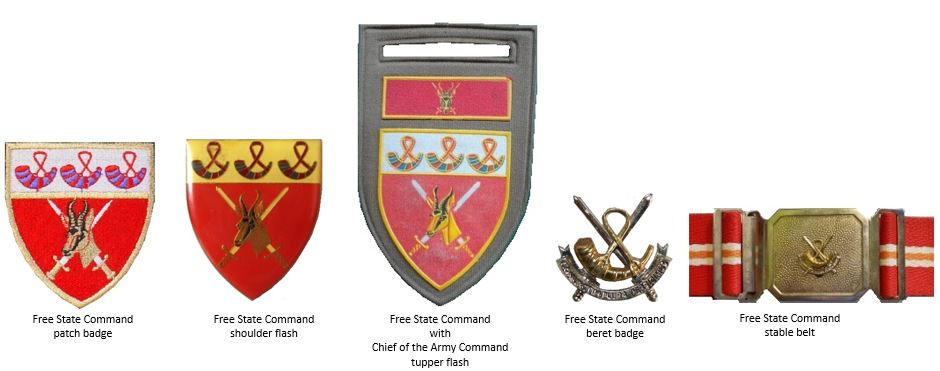
SADF era Free State Command insignia

In 1959 the Command was renamed back to Orange Free State Command. Later Brig Pieter Grobbelaar commanded. In April 1978 44 Parachute Brigade was formed within its command boundaries and Brigadier M. J. du Plessis, OC OFS Command, took over as the brigade commander.

==== SADF ====
In 1984 the command was reported to include:

- 2 Field Engineer Regiment SAEC (Bethlehem, Free State)
- 17 Field Squadron SAEC (Bethlehem, Free State)
- 35 Engineering Supplementary Unit (Kroonstad)
- Tank Squadron, 1 Special Service Battalion (Bloemfontein)
- 1 South African Infantry (Bloemfontein)
- 1 Parachute Battalion (Bloemfontein)
- 3 Military Hospital (Bloemfontein)

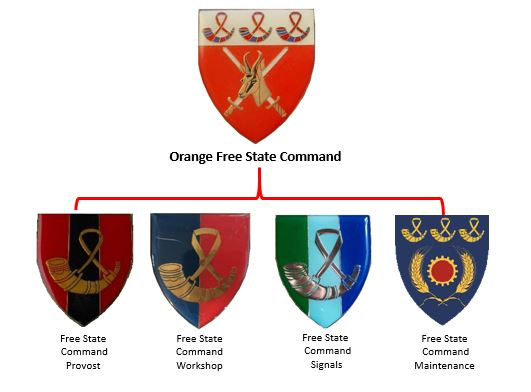
SADF Orange Free State Command Support Structure

Around 1991 44 Parachute Brigade was subordinated to OFS Command. McGill Alexander writes that: "... The status of being an independent formation consequently disappeared, and from being directly under command of Chief of the Army [44 Parachute Brigade] fell into the position of having three bosses: the Officer Commanding Rapid Deployment Force for conventional operations and exercises, Director of Operations at Army HQ for routine and unscheduled deployments inside the country and the Officer Commanding OFS Command for everything else."

Brigadier Reginald Otto served as officer commanding OFS Command, and later became Chief of the South African Army.

On 7 October 1999, the acting General Officer Commanding OFS Command, Brigadier General Hans Heinze, denied the existence of racial tensions at Tempe Military Base.

== Groups and Commando Units ==
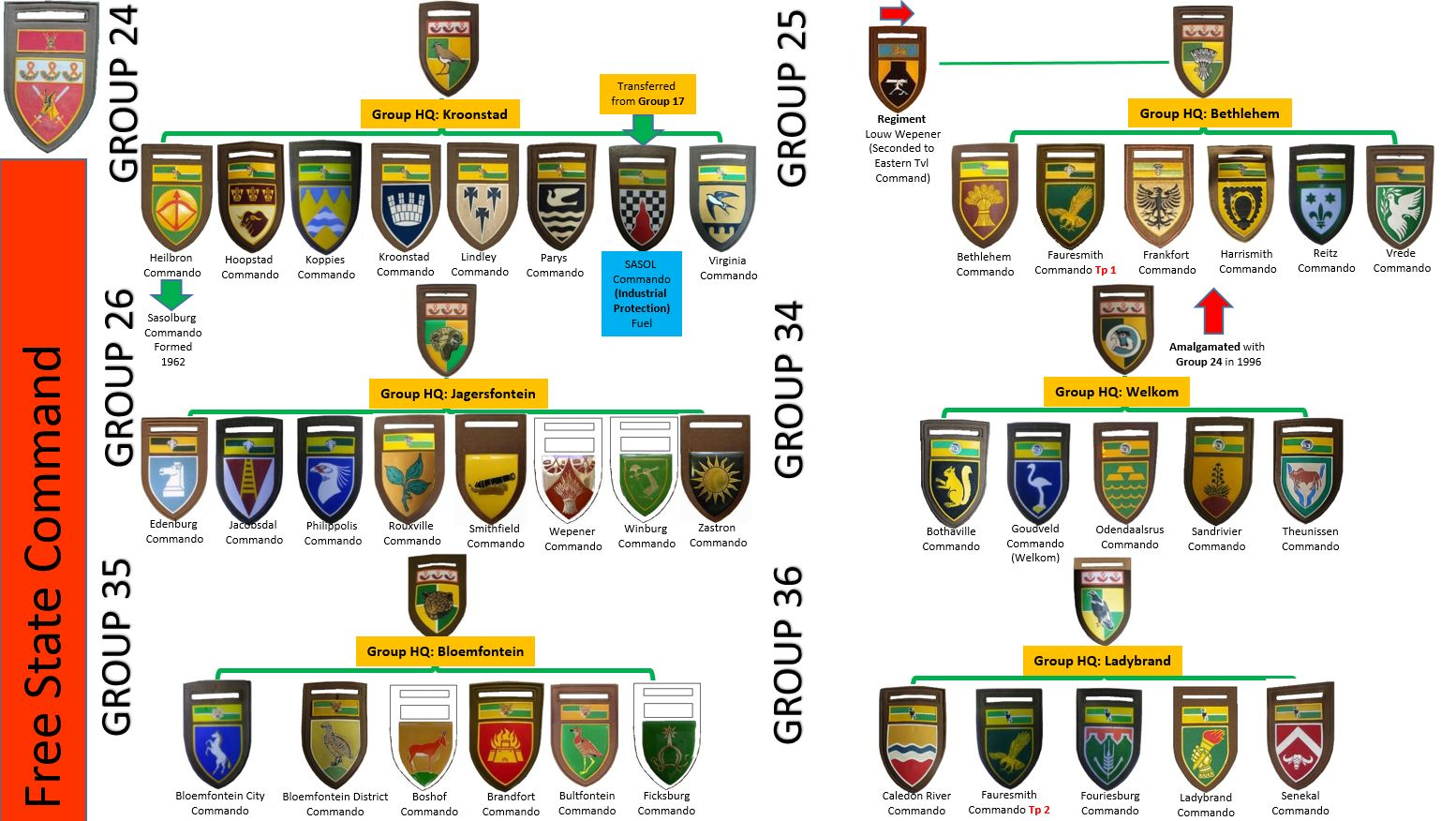
SADF era Free State Command Commando Structure

=== Group 24 (Kroonstad) ===
- Frankfort Commando
- Heilbron Commando
- Hoopstad Commando
- Koppies Commando
- Kroonstad Commando
- Lindley Commando
- Parys Commando
- Sasol Commando
- Sasolburg Commando
- Senekal Commando
- Virginia Commando
- Vrede Commando

=== Group 25 (Bethlehem) ===
- Bethlehem Commando
- Harrismith Commando
- Reitz Commando

=== Group 26 ===
- Jacobsdal Commando
- Phillipolis Commando
- Winburg Commando
- Zastron Commando

=== Group 34 (Welkom) ===
- Bothaville Commando
- Bultfontein Commando
- Odendaalsrus Commando
- Sanrivier Commando, Henneman
- Theunissen Commando
- Goldfields Commando

=== Group 35 (Bloemfontein) ===
- Bloemfontein City Commando
- Bloemfontein District Commando
- Brandfort Commando
- Edenburg Commando
- Ficksburg Commando
- Rouxville Commando
- Smithfield Commando
- University OFS Commando
- Wepener Commando
- Fouriesburg Commando

=== Group 36 (Ladybrand) ===
- Caledon River Commando
- Fauriesmith Commando
- Ladybrand Commando
- Senekal Commando

== Leadership ==
Leadership of Orange Free State Command
From	Commanding Officers	To	Ribbon
4 January 1935	Maj Gen Dan Pienaar CB	January 1937	Order of the Bath CB
?	Brig Willie Meyer	1988?	
1988?	Brig Reginald Otto SM,MMM (Note: Later Lieutenant General) (Note: Later Chief of the South African Army)	1992	Southern Cross Medal SM Military Merit Medal MMM
1992	Brig André Bestbier	1995	
1995	Brig Mos Grobler	n.d.	
c. 1960	Brig Pieter Grobbelaar SSA,DSO (Note: Later General) (Note: Later Commandant General of the Union Defence Force)	n.d.	Star of South Africa SSA Distinguished Service Order DSO
n.d.	Brig M. J. du Plessis	c. 1978	
From	Command Sgts Major	To	Ribbon
	No known incumbents		
