= Pieter Hendrik Kritzinger =

Boer general and Assistant Commandant of the Forces of the Orange Free State

General Pieter Hendrik Kritzinger
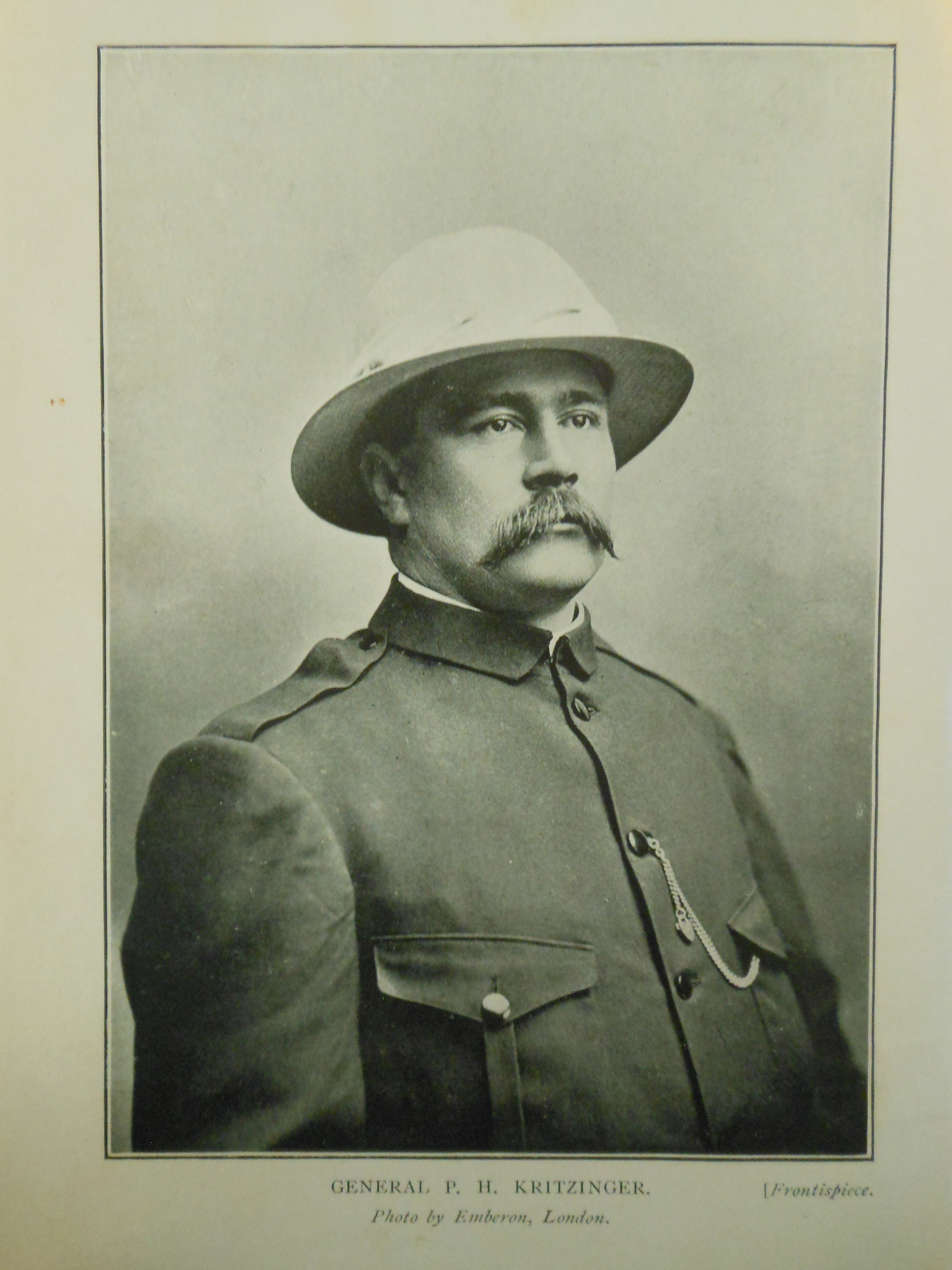
- Born: April 20, 1870; Wildemanskraal, Port Elizabeth, Cape Colony
- Died: October 2, 1935 (aged 65) Cradock, Cape Province, South Africa
- Allegiance: Orange Free State
- Branch: Army
- Commands: Rouxville Commando
- Conflicts: Second Boer War
- Spouse: Anna Dorothea Michau (m. 1907–d. 1935)
- Children: 3

Pieter Hendrik Kritzinger (20 April 1870 – 2 October 1935) was a Boer general and Assistant Commandant of the Forces of the Orange Free State and Commander-in-Chief of the Boer Rebel Forces in the Cape Colony and noted guerrilla commander during the Second Boer War who led the Boer invasions of the Cape Colony during the Guerilla Phase of the Second Boer War.

General Kritzinger was probably the only senior Boer officer to invade the Cape Colony four times during the Anglo Boer War. He did so as a burgher of the Rouxville Commando in November 1899, during the failed attempt of General Christiaan de Wet during the Second Boer Invasion of the Cape Colony on 16 December 1900, and returned to the Cape Colony for a third time on 15 May 1901 as a general until withdrawing on 15 August 1901. After recuperating and resting in the Ladybrand District, he made a fourth and last attempt to invade the Cape Colony via Sandrift on the night of 14/15 December 1901. With his commando he crossed the Noupoort - De Aar railway line late in the afternoon of 16 December 1901. Whilst turning around for the third time to pick up stragglers, he was shot through the chest and captured by soldiers of the Third Battalion, Grenadier Guards.

As a part of General de Wet's Free State forces, Kritzinger's commando and its offsplits of commonado's, under the leadership of Gideon Scheepers and Johannes Lötter, successfully launched attacks deep into the Cape Colony on the British troops. The British communications, railway and supply lines were severely disrupted.

== Ancestors ==
Pieter Kritzinger was a grandchild of the Kritzinger progenitor in South Africa, Johan Jakob Kritzinger (1744-1798), of Besigheim in Baden-Württemberg in Germany. Johan Jakob Pieter descended from the well-known Kepler family of Weil der Stadt, in Baden-Württemberg, a town which is known as the 'Gate to the Black Forest'.

Johan Jakob Kritzinger’s grandmother was Maria Barbara (Kepler) Grözinger (1661 – 1729), the daughter of Johan Melchior Kepler (1623 – 1687), an erstwhile Mayor of Besigheim, who lived in the Kepler manor house on Hauptstraße in Besigheim. Johan Melchior Kepler’s father was Georg Kepler ( - 1687) of Besigheim. Georg Kepler’s father was Johann (Hans) Kepler (1544 - 1593), from Weil der Stadt, who was the progenitor of the Kepler family of Besigheim. Kritzinger's ancestor Johann (Hans) Kepler was the older brother of Heinrich Kepler (1547 – c.1590), who was the father of the famous German astrologer, astronomer, mathematician and natural philosopher, Johannes Kepler (1571 – 1630).

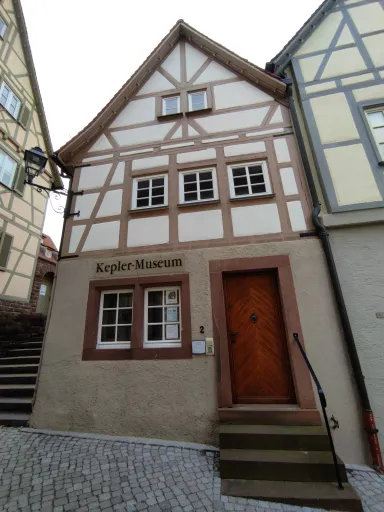
Kepler Museum, Weil der Stadt, Stuttgart

The father of Johann (Hans) Kepler and Heinrich Kepler was Sebald Kepler Junior (1519 – 1594), who was the Pfründverwalter (Chief Administrative Officer) of Weil der Stadt. On 27 February 1563 Maximillian II, Holy Roman Emperor rewarded him with a family crest in Vienna. His profession was bookbinder and he was for long a councillor and mayor of Weil der Stadt. His father, Sebald Kepler Senior (1490 – ) served as the Stadrechner (Town Treasurer) of Weil der Stadt. Sebald Kepler Senior’s father was Johannes Sebald Kepler Senior (1457 – 1501) of Nuremberg.

== Family ==
Pieter Kritzinger was a grandchild of the Kritzinger progenitor in South Africa, Johan Jakob Kritzinger (1744-1798). Johan Jakob was granted the farm, 'Piesangriviervallei' by the Dutch East India Company in 1766 and today this farm is at the heart of the town of Plettenberg Bay in the Western Cape.

Pieter Kritzinger was a great grandchild of A.B1. Jacobus Andreas (Andries) Rudolph Senior (1773 - 1809), who was the elder brother of A.B2. Gerhardus Jacobus (Gert) Rudolph (1797–1851), who was the last President of the Natalia Republic from 1842 tot 1843. Andries Rudolph was married to Johanna Magdalena Oosthuizen (1773 - 1864), the heiress of the farm, 'Paapenbietjesfontein aan de Baakensrivier', on which the city centre of Port Elizabeth was laid out. 'Paapenbietjiesfontein' comprised the modern day city centre of Port Elizabeth, South End and Humewood, all the way to Happy Valley, where the Sakrivier formed the boundary with the neighbouring farm, 'Strandfontein', which at the time belonged to the Voortrekker leader, Piet Retief. Johanna was also the aunt of the Voortrekker leader Gerrit Maritz, after whom the city of Pietermaritzburg was named.

Pieter Kritzinger's grandfather, A.B1.C3. Jacobus Andreas Rudolph Junior (1798–1881), participated in the Battle of Blood River in 1838.

Pieter Kritzinger was the son of Wessel Kritzinger and his wife, Magdalena Rudolph, and was born on the farm, 'Wildeman's Kraal' at the foot of the Suurberg Pass in the Alexandria District, near Port Elizabeth. In 1882 he moved with his parents to the Ladybrand district of the Orange Free State and at the age of seventeen began farming on his own in the Rouxville district. Wessel died in the Bloemfontein Concentration Camp on 20 April 1902.

== Participation in Anglo Boer War ==
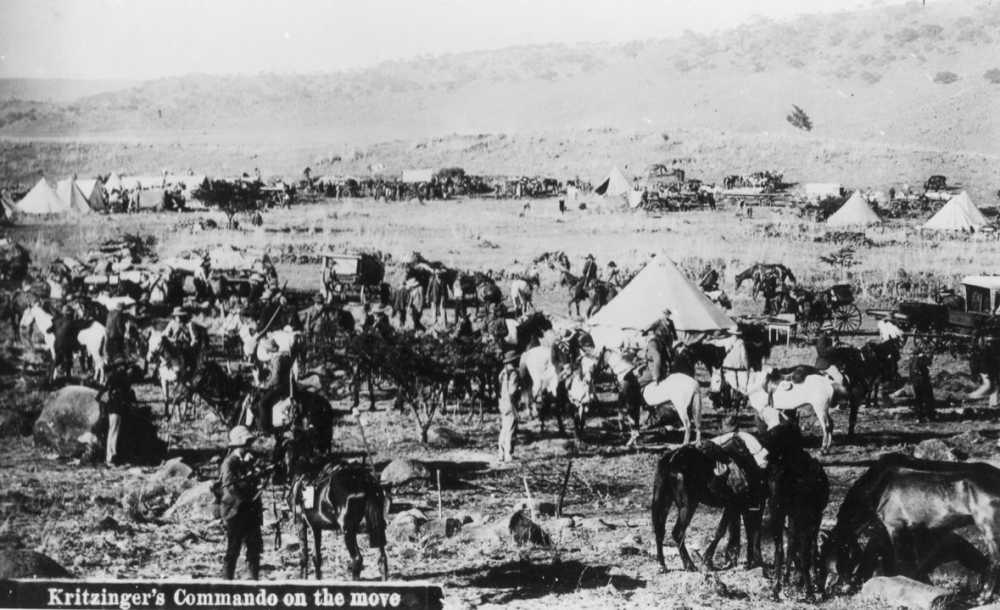
Military camp of Boer war general Kritzinger and his Commando, South Africa.

On the outbreak of the Second Boer War, as a burgher in the Rouxville Commando under General J.H. Olivier, he took part in the invasion of the Cape Colony and took part in the Battle of Stormberg on 10 December 1899. At the time, Kritzinger was engaged to a daughter of General J.H. Olivier, the victor of the Battle of Stormberg who led the humiliating defeat over Lieutenant-General William Forbes Gatacre, the hero of the Battle of Omdurman in Sudan. The Boer victory at the Battle of Stormberg, in which 135 British soldiers were killed and 696 captured was part of the British Black Week. Gatacre's reputation sank after Stormberg, and he returned to England and to his pre-war posting.

As a result of Lord Roberts' successful campaign which led to the collapse of Boer resistance on the western front and the occupation of Bloemfontein on 13 March 1900, the commando's at Stormberg had to retreat hastily to the north and the Rouxville Commando also had to turn back. North-east of Bloemfontein he joined the Orange Free State main force under General Christiaan de Wet in the same month.

Kritzinger participated in the Battle of Sanna's Post on 31 March 1900 and the Battle of Mostershoek at Reddersburg on 3 April 1900. Kritzinger was present when the Imperial Yeomanry under Colonel Basil Spragge surrendered to General Piet de Wet at Lindley on 31 May 1900. Thereafter he fought in the military operation in the north eastern Orange Free State until the surrender of General Marthinus Prinsloo at the end of July 1900. When General Christiaan de Wet's commando temporarily retreated across the Vaal River, the Rouxville Commando stayed behind in the vicinity of Winburg and when General Olivier was taken prisoner during an attack on Winburg on 27 August 1900, Kritzinger was elected as the commandant of the Rouxville Commando. On General Christiaan de Wet's return from Transvaal, Kritzinger and his commando once more joined the main force and his appointment was confirmed.

In December 1900, Kritzinger's commando formed part of the force with which General Christiaan de Wet attempted to invade the Cape Colony. The plan was foiled and Kritzinger was instructed to try again with his own commando as soon as the Orange River was fordable. On 16 December 1900 he succeeded in entering the Cape Colony at Odendaalstroom. Pursued by British columns, Kritzinger at the end of December 1900 crossed the railway between Noupoort and Middelburg, where they derailed a train. The commando then moved southwards through the Graaff-Reinet and Murraysburg districts, past Prince Albert to Oudtshoorn in the Little Karoo. The Cape rebel Gideon Scheepers, who was later executed by the British, was a member of Kritzinger's commando invading the Cape in December 1900.

After this he changed direction and went northeastwards to Somerset East. There was a great deal of commotion along this route and colonial rebels joined his commando. His actions between December 1900 and April 1901 led to the escalation of the war to parts of the Cape Colony which had hitherto been peaceful and caused the immediate intervention of an increasing number of mobile British units. In the Cradock and Tarkastad districts he was forced to divide his commando in two and retreat with one half to the Orange Free State.

He succeeded in fording the Orange River near Bethulie on 29 April 1901.

In April 1901 he was promoted by General Christiaan de Wet to the rank of General at the age of 31 years.

However, his undertaking had lasting effects on the subsequent military operations, for henceforth the war was also waged in British controlled areas and this gradually became an important theatre of war. The actions of a considerable number of rebel bands forced the British High Command to strengthen its forces in the Cape Colony at a time when it was hoped that the war was nearing its end. The political outcome in the Cape Colony was even more serious, because the loyalty of the Cape Afrikaners became involved. Kritzinger's services were recognised by General Christiaan de Wet when the latter appointed him Assistant Chief Commandant of the Orange Free State and Chief Commandant of the Colonial Forces in the Cape Colony on 7 May 1901.

Kritzinger invaded the Cape Colony once again at Norvalspont on 19 May 1901. Invested with more authority than he had formerly had, he united the rebel units in the area under him, then rode southwards and sent out, in all directions and under competent leaders, smaller sections whose number continually increased. He occupied Jamestown in the Eastern Cape on 2 June 1901, but found himself hard-pressed when mobile units descended upon him.

On 12 June 1901 General Kritzinger issued his 'Stormberg Proclamation'. He declared that the Orange Free State Occupation Proclamations of November 1899 were still valid and that the north-eastern part of the Cape Colony was still under the control of the Orange Free State and that martial law was still applicable. This Proclamation determined that all of the inhabitants of the north-eastern part of the Cape Colony were still viewed as subjects of the Orange Free State and not of the Cape Colony, and that any assistance to the imperial forces would be regarded as treason and punishable. Under these orders, pro-British black prisoners of war, regardless of whether they had been armed, were summarily executed. In response, the British court-martialed and executed Boers for killing black prisoners of war.

== Capture ==
He retreated to the Orange Free State again on 14 August 1901 and went to the Zastron district where he annihilated a British unit under Colonel A Murray at the Battle of Kwaggafontein on 20 September 1901. Continually harried in the Southern Orange Free State, Kritzinger's Commando invaded the Cape Colony for a third time at Sanddrif on 15 December 1901. Once again the enemy converged upon him from all sides and he was driven westwards in the direction of the railway line to the north. As he crossed the line on 16 December 1901 he was gravely wounded and taken prisoner while attempting to rescue a comrade, Lieutenant Gerrit Boldingh. Kritzinger safely reached the other side, but saw that Boldingh had been hit by a bullet, and turned back within a rain of bullet fire out of the nearby British blockhouse to go and rescue him. According to the Aliwal North newspaper this act of bravery was worthy of a Victoria Cross, if Kritzinger had fought on the British side.

== Court Case ==
After some weeks in hospital at Noupoort he was imprisoned as prisoner of war (POW) in the military prison at Graaff-Reinet and tried by the Graaff-Reinet Military Tribunal in March 1902 on the charge of rebellion.

Kritzinger's deputy commander, Gideon Scheepers was executed at Graaff-Reinet shortly before on 12 January 1902, after being convicted as a Cape rebel and war crimes. Scheepers has since achieved martyrdom status and an imposing monument was erected in his memory outside Graaff-Reinet.

General Kritzinger's fate turned upon how far he was responsible for the misdeeds of some of his subordinates. His defence team somehow managed to prove that he could not be held accountable for the excesses of his scattered commando and he was acquitted by the military court and managed to escape the hangman’s noose.

Kritzinger was acquitted by the Graaff-Reinet Military Tribunal after influential newspapers in England and the United States of America took up the cudgels on his behalf after the huge furore that Scheepers's death caused in the international news. One of the main petitioners for Kritzinger's release was WT Stead (the famous British newspaper editor who served as mentor to William Randolph Hearst and who died on the RMS Titanic). The release of Kritzinger was also debated in the House of Commons and various individuals and organisations sent petitions to the Privy Council.

Kritzinger was released after the British General Officer Commanding the 1st Division in the Second Boer War, Lord Paul Methuen, was released by General JH de la Rey, after he was captured by de la Rey at the Battle of Tweebosch on 7 March 1902.

== First Overseas Trip ==
Initially, after the Treaty of Vereeniging was signed on 31 May 1902, he went in exile to Mexico and the United States of America in an attempt to prevent the undertaking of the oath of allegiance to the British throne. In the United States he got engaged to the Spanish heiress of a large Tin mine in Chihuahua, Mexico, but he called the engagement off when he moved back to the Orange River Colony.

== Second Overseas Trip ==
After having settled in Ladybrand in the Orange River Colony, he soon thereafter again went to the United States to seek medical attention for his war wounds. With this trip, he was accompanied by his erstwhile private secretary, RD McDonald, to also seek a publisher for his biography and to give public lectures on the effects and consequences of the Anglo-Boer War and the concentration camps on the burghers of the Orange Free State. An account of his wartime experiences was published in London in 1905 under the title In the Shadow of Death - and is still in print to date.

== Third Overseas Trip ==
Shortly after his return, he was again sent to Europe by the Orange River Colony's Dutch Reformed Church to raise funds for Christian National Education in the colony. On this voyage he had meetings with the Boer sympathiser, Emily Hobhouse, WT Stead, Sir Henry Campbell-Bannerman, who was British prime minister at the time, as well as other influential politicians, who would later become British prime ministers, such as David Lloyd George and Ramsay MacDonald in order to tell them of the great needs of the post-war Orange River Colony. In the Netherlands, he was granted an audience by Queen Wilhelmina.

== Marriage ==
He later settled on the farm, 'Fleurville' in Swaershoek Pass outside Cradock, after marrying Anna Dorothea Michau in 1907.

Kritzinger's father-in-law was Paul Willem Michau (1856 - 1919) of 'Orange Grove' in Swaershoek Pass, who was a second-generation MP for Cradock and the last President of the Legislative Council of the Parliament of the Cape of Good Hope. Michau was an ally of Sir William Schreiner, who was the brother of the famous South African author Olive Schreiner and both families were close friends as they hailed from Cradock. After her death in 1920, Olive Schreiner was buried on Buffelskop, which is a mountainous hill at the back of 'Orange Grove'.

In 1904 Michau and Sir William Schreiner colluded forces and succeeded in overthrowing the Cabinet of the then Prime Minister of the Cape Colony, Sir Gordon Sprigg in an incident that is known as the Fall of the Fourth Sprigg Cabinet. Sir William Schreiner consequently became prime minister and Michau was elected as President of the Legislative Council. Senator Michau was also the founding president of the South African Agricultural Union, today known as AgriSA in 1904.

== Children ==
Kritzinger had three children, a son, Paul Michau, and two daughters, Lena and Juliana.

Paul Michau married Melvonie Botha of Pearston and the couple settled on the farm, 'Fleurville' in Swaershoek.

Lena married Barry Orpen, whose mother, Eileen Orpen, donated seven farms (comprising 24 549 hectares) to the Kruger National Park and in whose honour the Orpen Gate and Orpen Rest Camp and the Orpen Museum at the Kruger National Park were named.

Juliana was named after Queen Juliana of the Netherlands, but died of meningitis in 1919.

== Public life ==
Kritzinger played an important role in public life and served on various local bodies in the Cape Midlands. In 1929 he was elected a member of the Cape Provincial Council for Cradock and served as such until his death. When the fusion of the National Party and the South African Party took place in 1934, Kritzinger as a follower of General JBM Hertzog became a member of the United Party and was the Deputy Chairman of the United Party in the Cape at the time of his death.

== Legacy ==
Kritzinger was one of the four commanders-in-chief during the Anglo Boer War, the others being General CR de Wet for the Orange Free State, General Louis Botha for Natal, and General JH de la Rey for Transvaal, and as such he played a significant in the Anglo Boer War. He is mostly remembered for the role which he played in the prolonging of the Anglo Boer War after the fall of Bloemfontein and Pretoria and for extending the War into a Fourth Phase, namely the Guerilla Phase, that lasted from 29 November 1900 until 31 Mei 1902.

Various authors have written extensively on Kritzinger and his contribution to the Anglo-Boer War over the years, most notably Sir Arthur Conan Doyle of Sherlock Holmes fame, in his book, The Great Boer War, where he devoted two chapters on Kritzinger, and described his style of military engagement as a "devil's dance".

Kritzinger's personal archive of artifacts, correspondence, documents, ephemera, letters, newspaper articles and photos was inherited by his only grandson who bears his surname, Councillor Dr Dr Julian Kritzinger (1983 - ) of Worcester in the Western Cape.
