= Gideon Scheepers =

Boer military leader, scout and heliographer

Commandant Gideon Jacobus Scheepers
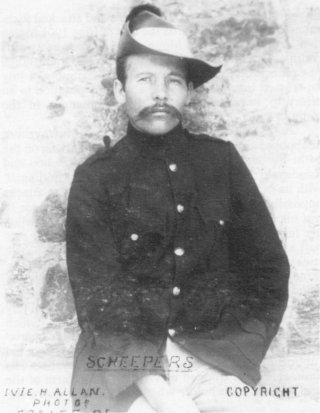
- Born: 4 April 1878; Middelburg, Colony of Transvaal
- Died: 18 January 1902 (aged 23); Graaff-Reinet, Cape Colony
- Cause of death: Execution by firing squad
- Military career
- Allegiance: South African Republic; Orange Free State
- Rank: Commandant
- Units: State Artillery Regiment (1895–1898); Regiment Universiteit Oranje-Vrystaat (1898–1902)
- Conflicts: Second Boer War; Battle of Magersfontein

Commandant Gideon Jacobus Scheepers (4 April 1878 – 18 January 1902) was a Boer military leader, scout and heliographer during the Anglo-Boer War (also known as the South African war). He is remembered as a South African martyr and for having been executed for "alleged" war crimes.

== Early years ==
Gideon Jacobus Scheepers was born on 4 April 1878 on the farm Grootlaagte, Middelburg, Transvaal Colony. Gideon entered into the military service of the South African Republic when he became a combat-ready citizen (weerbare burger) of the country at the age of 16 in 1894. He trained as a heliographer (a specialist trained to use a mirror and sunlight to transmit messages to other troops) in the State Artillery. In 1898 Gideon was already an expert in heliography in Transvaal and was asked to join the Free State Artillery in Bloemfontein to establish a field telegraphy unit there. Gideon was 'loaned' with the understanding that he would rejoin his old corps after completing his work. For more than a year, until roughly September 1899, Gideon trained young field telegraphists of the Free State Artillery. A month later (October 1899), when war was declared, Gideon was able to provide almost every Free State commando unit with young heliographists. Although they were not yet experts, they were already familiar with Morse code and the use of mirrors. Several of them provided outstanding service, particularly during the later phases of the war. In August 1899, six weeks before the declaration of war, Gideon Scheepers (already a sergeant by then) was busy setting up a heliograph connection between Bloemfontein and Pretoria.

== Anglo-Boer War ==
He accompanied the Free State commandos to its western border. During the Siege of Kimberley he shot two captured natives (then the polite term) on the grounds that they were allegedly scouts. General Christiaan de Wet used him as a scout and later promoted him to captain in charge of his own reconnaissance corps.

=== Invasion of the Cape ===
In December 1900 Scheepers was a member of commandant Kritzinger's commando that invaded the Cape Colony. Within eight weeks their ways parted when Kritzinger returned to the Free State. After recruiting many Cape rebels, he was promoted to commandant of 150 men, marauding in the Cape. Kritzinger's commando sabotaged British rail and telegraph lines. They executed blacks accused of spying for the British.

At the beginning of October 1901, Scheepers and his commando were in the Langeberg, south of Ladismith, and although he was so ill that he could not ride a horse, he still directed the movements of his commando.

In September 1901 Scheepers started getting ill. By 10 October, when they were close to the Prince Albert Road station, he was too ill to stay with his commando and he had to be left behind.

On the morning of 9 October 1901, the now very ill Scheepers moved toward Prince Albert. On 9 October 1901, in the vicinity of the Dwyka and Gamka, Scheepers was carried into a farmhouse that evening. At 04:00 on the morning of 10 October 1901, Scheepers tried to get up when everyone was already saddled, and he said: “I tried with all the strength in my power to get myself out of bed, but in vain.” Scheepers’ description of the parting from his comrades and officers, including his devoted adjutant Carl Rhemkül—all shed tears. Thus, on 10 October 1901, exhausted and spent, Scheepers had to surrender, but at least Lieutenant Pypers and the commando escaped. After a week at Matjesfontein, he was transported to Beaufort West and was strictly guarded in a hospital tent enclosed by 8 strands of barbed wire, with guards standing day and night with fixed bayonets. He was in Beaufort West from 19 October to 14 November, when he was again transported to Graaff-Reinet. At Matjesfontein, he still had to be carried to and from the train, and at the Naauwpoort junction, he was completely drenched in sweat and full of pain, so they carried him from the train to the hospital where some of Commandant Lötter’s wounded rebels also lay. Within a few days, Scheepers’ condition improved and he had less pain, allowing him to write letters and receive visitors (his diet consisted only of milk). On 8 December 1901, Scheepers was transported from Naauwpoort and arrived in Graaff-Reinet on 9 December 1901, and was strong enough to walk from the train to the ambulance wagon with the help of one man. Because he was too weak, the trial had to be postponed from Monday, 16 December, to Wednesday, 18 December. On Monday, 23 December, he could again not go to court due to illness, and it was postponed until Friday, 27 December, where he had to conduct his own defense with a fever of 103 °F (39.4 °C). On the afternoon of Saturday, 28 December, the court case was completed, and Scheepers was convinced—after Tennant’s bullying and observing the court’s attitude—that the whole affair was merely a comedy act with meddling from start to finish and that the verdict was already prepared against him. Gideon’s accusers had burned down the Transvaal and Free State; they destroyed towns in the Transvaal and leveled churches to the ground, but for his burning of English government buildings, he was charged with “arson” and also for “murder.”

=== Trial and execution ===
Scheepers faced 16 charges in a court martial: 7 of murder, 1 of attempted murder, 1 that he placed a prisoner in the enemy's line of fire, 1 of maltreatment of a POW, 3 of assault, 2 of malicious injury to property and 1 of arson (15 incidents). 54 witnesses were called to testify for the prosecution. Scheepers did not appoint his own attorney but the military court appointed Tom Auret to supposedly "defend" Scheepers and not Carl Auret.

First accusation: Murder of two native spies at Sekretariskraal in the district of Murraysburg. Scheepers: As far as I know, those natives were captured by Commandant Kritzinger or Fouché's men; I was not in a council of war and did not see the prisoners either.(Note: The historical Dutch term used in the original text is in modern historical context translated as native or Black.)

Third accusation: "Murder" of the native at Barrington's place, Jansenville district. Scheepers: Of this native I know absolutely nothing, nor was I aware that "according to testimony against me," there was any prisoner of that nature. Fouché and Malan were also camped at the same location.

I will do all the rest later until accusation thirteen.

Scheepers was convicted on all counts except one of the murder charges. He was sentenced to death. On 18 January 1902 he was executed by firing squad, while tied to a chair. He was reburied during the night in an unknown grave, and to this day his place of burial is unknown.

== Cultural depictions ==
- Gideon Scheepers (1982) - an Afrikaans language movie about Scheepers' trial and execution.

== Bibliography ==
- Farwell, Byron (1990) [1979]. The Great Anglo-Boer War. Harper & Row, Inc. ISBN 0-393-30659-3.
- Pretorius, Fransjohan (2009). The A to Z of the Anglo-Boer War. Scarecrow Press, Inc. ISBN 978-0-8108-7629-3.
- J. E. H. Grobler, The War Reporter: the Anglo-Boer war through the eyes of the burghers, Johannesburg: Jonathan Ball Publishers, 2004. ISBN 978-1-86842-186-2. Pages 77, 89, 96-97, 103, 111, 114, 119, 124-125, 131-133, 136.
- Thomas Pakenham, The Boer War, George Weidenfeld & Nicolson, London, 1979. Abacus, 1992. ISBN 0 349 10466 2. Pages 447, 526, and 561.
- Gustav Schoeman Preller, Scheepers se Dagboek / Scheepers Diary, 1940. Nasionale Pers, Beperk.
