= SASOL Commando =

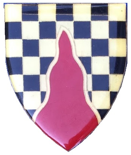
- SASOL Commando emblem
- Active: 1962-
- Country: South Africa
- Allegiance: Republic of South Africa; Republic of South Africa
- Branch: South African Army; South African Army
- Type: Infantry
- Role: Light Infantry (Key Industrial Protection)
- Size: One Battalion
- Part of: South African Infantry Corps; Army Territorial Reserve
- Garrison/HQ: Sasolburg at SASOL 1

SASOL Commando was a light infantry regiment of the South African Army. It formed part of the South African Army Infantry Formation as well as the South African Territorial Reserve.

== History ==
=== Origin ===
Oil was the one major raw material not available in South Africa except synthetically from coal. This priority resource was therefore placed under a high degree of control by the government, which expected to meet 50% of its oil needs from the SASOL program. The South African Coal Oil and Gas Corporation was a state controlled company. Three large plants were developed and eventually considered National Key Points.

=== The first industrial Commando ===
The SASOL Commando was formed from workers from the refinery to protect these installations as they were already trained in the safety protocols and how to handle the inherent dangers involved.

These members had been originally part of the Heilbron Commando but were released on 14 February 1962 to form this first industrial commando. An industrial commando was specifically tasked to primarily protect sensitive installations. By 1974 a few other industrial commandos had been formed as well.

=== Relationship with other Commandos ===
The SASOL Commando's first permanent HQ was opened in May 1975. They worked closely with Regiment Sasolburg on external threats to the refinery.

=== Freedom of the City ===
Freedom of the City of Sasolburg was awarded to the unit in August 1979.

=== Attacks on the refinery and response ===
In June 1980, the SASOL plants were targeted by the ANC's MK, which resulted in the National Key Points Act being strengthened. Other companies considered critical could now be required to host commandos, would be given military training and be integrated into regional military plans. The attack on SASOL 1 itself resulted in a scaling up of activities of this unit.

Combined with the Sasolburg Commando, it had become the largest commando (battalion size) in the 1980s.

=== Change of Command ===
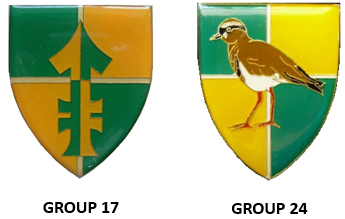
SADF SASOL Commando Higher Commands

The unit was brought under the command of Group 17 in January 1981 so that it could assist in the protection of industries of the Vaal Triangle. The SASOL Commando was finally transferred to Group 24 at Kroonstad.

=== Disbandment ===
This unit, along with all other Commando units was disbanded after a decision by South African President Thabo Mbeki to disband all Commando Units. The Commando system was phased out between 2003 and 2008 "because of the role it played in the apartheid era", according to the Minister of Safety and Security Charles Nqakula.

== Unit Insignia ==
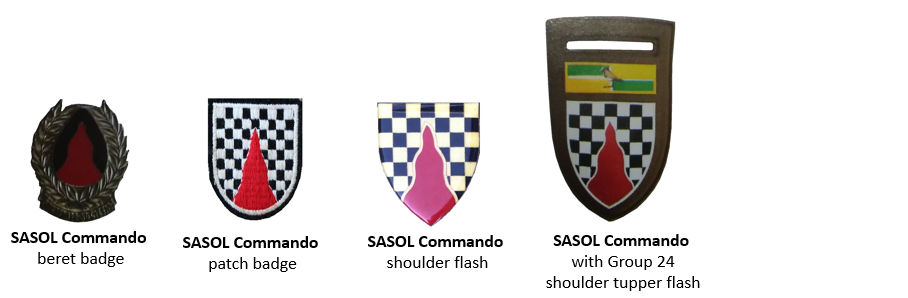
SADF SASOL Commando insignia

== See also ==
- South African Commando System
