= Reginald Otto =

South African military commander (1943–2022)

Lieutenant General Reginald Otto SD & Bar SM MMM
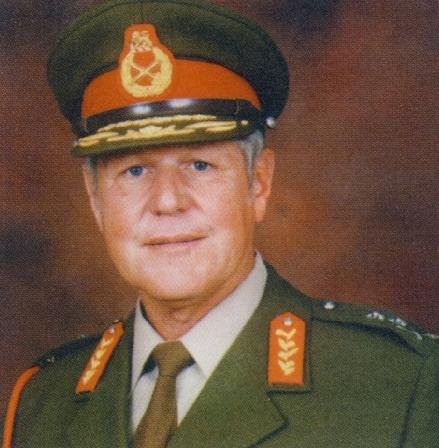
- Born: 9 July 1943; Krugersdorp, Transvaal Province, Union of South Africa
- Died: July 5, 2022 (aged 78)
- Relatives: 'Kowie' Jacoba Otto (nee Kleynhans)
- Military career
- Allegiance: South Africa
- Branch: South African Army
- Service years: 1964–1998
- Rank: Lieutenant General
- Nickname: Reg
- Commands: Eastern Transvaal Command; Orange Free State Command; 1 Special Service Battalion; School of Armour
- Awards: Southern Cross Decoration SD & Bar Southern Cross Medal SM Military Merit Medal MMM Pro Patria Medal (South Africa) Southern Africa Medal General Service Medal (South Africa) Unitas (Unity) Medal Good Service Medal Legion of Merit LOM Order of the Cloud and Banner ORB

Lieutenant General Reginald Otto SD & Bar SM MMM (9 July 1943 – 5 July 2022) was a South African military commander, who held the post of Chief of the South African Army.

== Military career ==
He joined the South African Army in 1964 after completing his schooling at Trumpsburg High School. After Officer training at the Army Gymnasium he was appointed a 2nd lieutenant in 1 Special Service Battalion. He became Officer Commanding of 1 Special Service Battalion in January 1976. He also commanded the School of Armour from 11 January 1981 to 18 December 1983.

He was promoted to Brigadier and OC Orange Free State Command. He was later promoted to Major general and GOC Eastern Transvaal Command.

== Awards and decorations ==
General Otto was awarded the following:

- Southern Cross Decoration (SD & Bar)
- Southern Cross Medal (1975) (SM)
- Military Merit Medal (MMM)
- Pro Patria Medal (South Africa) (with Cunene Clasp) (Note: Only the Cunene clasp was awarded, to members who served in Angola during Operation Savannah in 1975 and 1976. Recipients of the clasp wear a button, with the letter C encircled by a wreath, on the ribbon bar.)
- Southern Africa Medal
- General Service Medal (South Africa)
- Unitas (Unity) Medal
- Good Service Medal (Gold (30 Years))
- Good Service Medal (Silver (20 Years))
- Good Service Medal (Bronze (10 Years))
- Legion of Merit (Commander) (LOM) (USA)
- Order of the Cloud and Banner (4^{th} Grade - with Special Cravat) (ORB) (Taiwan)

== See also ==
- List of South African military chiefs
- South African Army

== Notes ==
Military offices
Preceded by Hattingh Pretorius	Chief of the South African Army; 1995–1998	Succeeded by Gilbert Ramano
Preceded by JPM 'Hans' Möller	GOC Eastern Transvaal Command; 1992–1994	Succeeded by Deon Ferreira
Preceded by Willie Meyer	OC Orange Free State Command; 1987–1992	Succeeded by André Bestbier
Preceded by AJ Snyman	OC School of Armour; 1980–1983	Succeeded by Alwyn van Niekerk
Preceded by APR Carstens	OC 1SSB; 1976–1979	Succeeded by Bertie Botha
