= Regiment Sasolburg =

Sasolburg Commando / Regiment
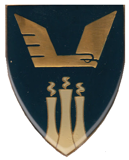
- Sasolburg Commando and Regiment
- Active: 1962-
- Country: South Africa
- Allegiance: Republic of South Africa; Republic of South Africa
- Branch: South African Army; South African Army
- Type: Infantry
- Role: Light Infantry
- Size: One Battalion
- Part of: South African Infantry Corps; Army Territorial Reserve
- Garrison/HQ: Sasolburg
- Mottos: Nisi dominus frustra (Without the Lord, frustration)

Sasolburg Regiment was a light infantry regiment of the South African Army. It formed part of the South African Army Infantry Formation as well as the South African Territorial Reserve.

== History ==
=== Origin ===
This unit was originally part of the Heilbron Commando before forming the Sasolburg Commando in February 1962.

=== Operations ===
==== With the SADF ====
Where the SASOL Commando was responsible for the SASOL and NATREF refineries, the Sasolburg Commando was responsible for all other factories and installations in the larger district.

The development of industries such as the African Explosives and Chemical Industries (AECI) and Karbochem increased the responsibility on the Sasolburg Commando as workers of these industries with Citizen Force Camp requirements were also transferred to the Sasolburg Commando.

===== From Commando to Regiment =====
The Sasolburg Commando was reclassified as a regiment in June 1985, even though its expanded responsibilities had existed since 4 February 1985. This new Regiment exercised its Freedom of Entry into Sasolburg for the first time on 25 October 1986.

===== The counter-insurgency battalion =====
In 1986 a decision was made that the Regiment would also be reclassed as a counter insurgency battalion and meant that it could be utilised in the black townships for riot control as well.

===== Command =====
The unit was initially under the command of Group 17 but was transferred to Group 42 in 1991, so that several units could be merged and be used in the greater Witwatersrand.

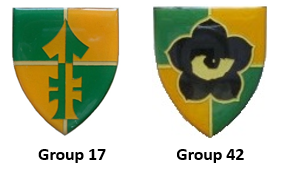
SADF Regiment Sasolburg higher commands

==== With the SANDF ====
===== Disbandment =====
This unit, along with all other Commando units was disbanded after a decision by South African President Thabo Mbeki to disband all Commando Units. The Commando system was phased out between 2003 and 2008 "because of the role it played in the apartheid era", according to the Minister of Safety and Security Charles Nqakula.

== Leadership ==
Leadership
From	Honorary Colonels	To	Ribbon
	No known incumbents		
From	Commanding Officers	To	Ribbon
nd	Cmdt Johannes J Retief*	nd	
From	Regimental Sergeants Major	To	Ribbon
	No known incumbents		

- last OC Sasolburg Commando, first OC Regiment Sasolburg.

== Unit Insignia ==
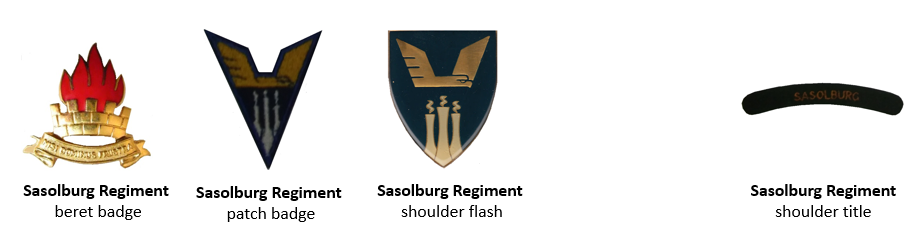
SADF Regiment Sasolburg insignia

== See also ==
- South African Commando System
