= André Bestbier =

South Africa international rugby union player (1946–2021)

- Born: André Bestbier; 31 March 1946 Potchefstroom, South Africa
- Died: 8 August 2021 (aged 75) Pretoria, South Africa
- Height: 1.80 m (5 ft 11 in)
- Weight: 90 kg (198 lb)
- School: Oudtshoorn High School
- Notable relative: Frank Bestbier (brother)

Rugby union career
Provincial / State sides
Years	Team	Apps	(Points)
1972–1976	Free State	30	
International career
Years	Team	Apps	(Points)
1974	South Africa	1	(0)
1974	South Africa (tour)	4	(0)

André Bestbier (31 March 1946 – 8 August 2021) was a South African rugby union player and army officer, who was the commander of the Orange Free State Command from 1992 to 1995.

== Rugby career ==
Bestbier played his provincial rugby for the Free State and made his test debut for the Springboks during the Springbok tour of France, as a replacement for Robert Cockrell after 28 minutes in the second half of the second test on 30 November 1974 at Parc des Princes in Paris. This second half appearance was his only test for South Africa, but he played in a further four tour matches for the Springboks during the French tour.

=== Test history ===
No.	Opposition	Result (SA 1st)	Position	Tries	Date	Venue
1.	France	10–8	Replacement		30 November 1974	Parc des Princes, Paris

== See also ==
- List of South Africa national rugby union players – Springbok no. 485

Military offices
Preceded by E. Olckers	OC 1 Reconnaissance Commando; 1983 – 1988	Succeeded by G. Keulder
Preceded by Reginald Otto	OC Orange Free State Command; 1992 – 1995	Succeeded by Mos Grobler
