= Harrismith Commando =

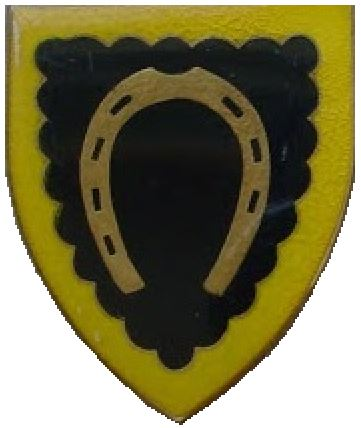
- Harrismith Commando emblem
- Active: 1899-2008
- Disbanded: 2008
- Country: South Africa
- Allegiance: Orange Free State Republic; Union of South Africa; Republic of South Africa; Republic of South Africa
- Branch: South African Army; South African Army
- Type: Infantry
- Role: Light Infantry
- Size: One Battalion
- Part of: South African Infantry Corps; Army Territorial Reserve, Group 25
- Garrison/HQ: Harrismith

Harrismith Commando was a light infantry regiment of the South African Army. It formed part of the South African Army Infantry Formation as well as the South African Territorial Reserve.

== History ==
=== Origin ===
This unit originated upon the mobilisation orders of the Orange Free State Republic in 1899.

=== Operations ===
==== With the Free State Republic ====
===== Anglo Boer War =====
This commando was initially sent to occupy mountain passes of the Drakensberg between the Orange Free State and the British Colony of Natal. English speakers of Harrismith were sent to the Oliviershoek Pass or serve in the Town Guard.

The first engagement of the war was at Besters Station with an advance on Ladysmith when this commando occupied Middle Hill. 100 men from the commando were part of the initial assault.

The first Free Stater to die in the Anglo Boer War, Fred Johnson, came from this commando.

This Commando was also involved in the battle of Rietfontein which took place on 24 October 1899 between six commandos of the Free State Army commanded by General A Piet Cronje and a British Flying Column dispatched from Ladysmith under the command of Sir George White.

The Free State forces consisted of the following commandos:

- Harrismith Commando,
- Kroonstad Commando,
- Winburg Commando,
- Bethlehem Commando,
- Vrede Commando and
- Heilbron Commando.

In 1900, the commando together with those from Vrede and Heilbron were again assigned the defence of the mountain passes.

The remnants of the Harrismith Commando was captured in a sweep operation between block house lines by a British column on 13 February 1902.

==== With the UDF ====
By 1902 all Commando remnants were under British military control and disarmed.

By 1912, previous Commando members could however join shooting associations.

By 1940, such commandos were under control of the National Reserve of Volunteers.

These commandos were formally reactivated by 1948.

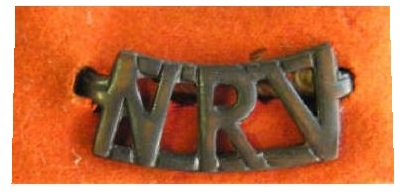
UDF era National Reserve of Volunteers shoulder tab

==== With the SADF ====
During this era, the unit was mainly used for rural area force protection, police assistance and stock theft control. The unit was also engaged in securing the Lesotho border.

The unit resorted under the command of the SADF's Group 25.

==== With the SANDF ====
===== Disbandment =====
This unit, along with all other Commando units was disbanded after a decision by South African President Thabo Mbeki to disband all Commando Units. The Commando system was phased out between 2003 and 2008 "because of the role it played in the apartheid era", according to the Minister of Safety and Security Charles Nqakula.

Harrismith Commando was the last commando to be disbanded, in March 2008.

== Unit Insignia ==
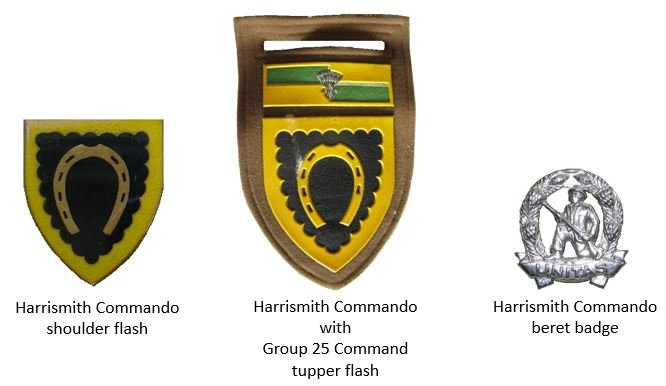
SADF era Harrismith Commando insignia

== Leadership ==
Leadership
From	Honorary Colonels	To	Ribbon
	No known incumbents		
From	Commanding Officers	To	Ribbon
1899	Cmdt C.J. de Villiers	nd	
1900	Cmdt Phillip Botha	nd	
1902	Cmdt Truter	nd	
1994	Lt Col onel A.J. Jordaan	2008	
From	Regimental Sergeants Major	To	Ribbon
	No known incumbents		

== Memorials ==
=== Reconciliation Memorial ===
On 11 June 2017, a Reconciliation Memorial was unveiled at Platrand near Ladysmith. This memorial honours the fierce battle that occurred on 6 January 1900 between the Devonshire Regiment and the Harrismith Commando on that site.

=== Market Square ===
The towns market square has a monument, adjacent Warden Street, to the memory of those who served in the Harrismith Commando. An obelisk in the same street in front of the Dutch Reformed Church lists the names of the men of the Harrismith Commando who died in the Anglo Boer war. Of the 73 names, 19 are listed as having died at Platrand, 32 killed or mortally wounded elsewhere and 22 who died in prisoner of war camps overseas and buried in India and Sri Lanka.

== See also ==
- South African Commando System
