= Hattingh Pretorius =

Lieutenant General Hattingh Johannes Pretorius SD SM MMM
- Born: January 1942; Trompsburg, Orange Free State, Union of South Africa
- Died: 2008 (aged 65–66)
- Relatives: Leatitia Pretorius (Wife)
- Military career
- Allegiance: South Africa
- Branch: South African Army
- Service years: 1962–1994
- Rank: Lieutenant General
- Unit: 4 South African Infantry
- Commands: Chief of the South African Army
- Awards: Southern Cross Decoration SD Southern Cross Medal SM Military Merit Medal MMM Pro Patria Medal General Service Medal (South Africa) Unitas (Unity) Medal Good Service Medal

Lieutenant General Hattingh Pretorius SD SM MMM (1942–2008) was a South African military commander, who held the post of Chief of the South African Army 1 November 1993 – 31 December 1994.

== Awards and decorations ==
- Southern Cross Decoration (SD)
- Southern Cross Medal (1975) (SM)
- Military Merit Medal (MMM)
- Pro Patria Medal
- General Service Medal (South Africa)
- Unitas (Unity) Medal
- Good Service Medal (Gold (30 Years))
- Good Service Medal (Silver (20 Years))
- Good Service Medal (Bronze (10 Years))

== See also ==
- List of South African military chiefs
- South African Army

Military offices
Preceded by Georg Meiring	Chief of the South African Army; 1993–1994	Succeeded by Reginald Otto
Preceded by Minaar Fourie	GOC Far North Command; 1992–1993	Succeeded by Faan Grobbelaar
Preceded by PEK Bosman	OC Natal Command; 1986–1992	Succeeded by Deon Ferreira
