= Deon Ferreira =

South African Army General (1946-2002)

Lieutenant General Deon Ferreira PVD SD SM MMM
- Born: 1 January 1946; Graaff-Reinet, South Africa
- Died: 2002 (aged 55–56)
- Spouse: Hermien Ferreira (née van Molendorff)
- Military career
- Allegiance: South Africa; South Africa
- Branch: South African Army
- Service years: –2000
- Rank: Lieutenant General
- Nickname: Falcon
- Unit: 32 Battalion
- Commands: Chief of Joint Operations; GOC Eastern Transvaal Command; OC Natal Command; OC 32 Battalion; OC 20 Brigade
- Conflicts: Operation Moduler; Kassinga; Savate
- Awards: Pro Virtute Decoration PVD Southern Cross Decoration SD Southern Cross Medal SM Military Merit Medal MMM Pro Patria Medal Southern Africa Medal General Service Medal (South Africa) Unitas (Unity) Medal Good Service Medal

Lieutenant General Deon Ferreira PVD SD SM MMM (1946-2002) was a South African Army officer. He served as Chief of Joint Operations before his retirement.

== Early life ==
He was born on New Years day 1946 in Graaff-Reinet, South Africa and matriculated from Graaf Reniet High School. He was the son of Alwyn Burger Ferreira and Hester Magdalena (Bosman) Ferreira.

== Military career ==
He served in the infantry corps and served as personal assistant to Gen Rudolph Hiemstra. He was SO1 Operations during Ops Savannah and later with the rank of colonel commanded 32 Battalion from 1978 – 1982 in the Bush War. He commanded 20 Brigade and Natal Command. Before being appointed as CJ Ops and was the commander of Eastern Transvaal Command until 1997.

== Awards and decorations ==
- Pro Virtute Decoration (PVD)
- Southern Cross Decoration (SD)
- Southern Cross Medal (1975) (SM)
- Military Merit Medal (MMM)
- Pro Patria Medal
- Southern Africa Medal
- General Service Medal (South Africa)
- Unitas (Unity) Medal
- Good Service Medal (Gold (30 Years))
- Good Service Medal (Silver (20 Years))
- Good Service Medal (Bronze (10 Years))

Military offices
Preceded by Wessel Kritzinger as Chief of Staff Operations	Chief of Joint Operations; 1997–2000	Succeeded by Godfrey Ngwenya
Preceded by Reginald Otto	GOC Eastern Transvaal Command; 1994–1997	Succeeded by Derrick Mgwebi
Preceded by Hattingh Pretorius	OC Natal Command; 1992–1994	Succeeded by Brig Chris Le Roux
Preceded by Gert C Nel	OC 32 Battalion; 1978–1982	Succeeded by Eddie Viljoen
