= Senekal Commando =

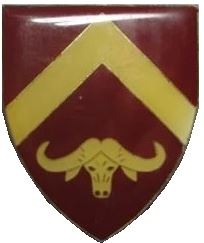
- Senekal Commando emblem
- Active: 1900 - 2003
- Disbanded: March 14, 2003 (23 years ago)
- Country: South Africa
- Allegiance: Orange Free State Republic; Union of South Africa; Republic of South Africa; Republic of South Africa
- Branch: South African Army; South African Army
- Type: Infantry
- Role: Light Infantry
- Size: One Battalion
- Part of: South African Infantry Corps; Army Territorial Reserve, Group 36
- Garrison/HQ: Senekal

Senekal Commando was a light infantry regiment of the South African Army. It formed part of the South African Army Infantry Formation and the South African Territorial Reserve.

== History ==
=== Origin ===
This unit started as a subunit of the Winburg Commando around 1900.

=== Operations ===
==== With the Orange Free State Republic ====
After the battle of Paardekraal, the Senekal Commando joined up with General de Wet. On 4 April 1900, they defeated a British column near Mostertshoek. This was followed by a siege of Brabant's Horse at Jammersberg Drift, near Wepener.

The last major engagement was the Battle of Biddulphsberg on 29 May 1900. A combined Boer force of approximately 400 men and three artillery pieces, drawn from several eastern Free State commandos under the overall command of General A.I. de Villiers, took up positions on the mountain and surrounding flats of Biddulphsberg, some 13 kilometres east of Senekal. The British force under Lieutenant-General Sir Leslie Rundle, comprising close to 4,000 men drawn from the 16th Infantry Brigade with artillery support, advanced from Senekal on 28 May and engaged the Boer positions the following morning. A veld fire driven by a wind shift swept across the advancing British troops, compounding the Boer rifle and artillery fire; British losses totalled 185 men, of whom 47 were killed or died of wounds, 130 were wounded, and eight were missing. Boer casualties were comparatively light, two men killed or fatally wounded and three wounded, though General de Villiers was struck by a bullet during the British withdrawal and subsequently died in Senekal.

==== With the UDF ====
By 1902, all Commando remnants were under British military control and disarmed.

By 1912, however, previous Commando members could join shooting associations.

By 1940, such commandos were controlled by the National Reserve of Volunteers.

These commandos were formally reactivated by 1948.

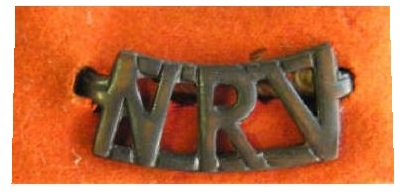
UDF era National Reserve of Volunteers shoulder tab

==== Under the SADF ====
In this era, the commando was utilised primarily for area force protection.

This unit fell under the command of Group 36.

==== With the SANDF ====
===== Disbandment =====
This unit, along with all other Commando units was disbanded after a decision by South African President Thabo Mbeki to disband all Commando Units. The Commando system was phased out between 2003 and 2008 "because of the role it played in the apartheid era", according to the Minister of Safety and Security Charles Nqakula.

== Leadership ==
Leadership
From	Honorary Colonels	To	Ribbon
	No known incumbents		
From	Commanding Officers	To	Ribbon
1900	Cmdt A.I. de Villiers	nd	
1901	Cmdt S.G. Vilonel	nd	
From	Regimental Sergeants Major	To	Ribbon
	No known incumbents		

- Kommandant J.J. Human 1973

== See also ==
- South African Commando System
