= Vrede Commando =

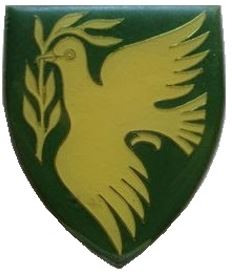
- Vrede Commando emblem
- Country: South Africa
- Allegiance: Orange Free State Republic; Union of South Africa; Republic of South Africa; Republic of South Africa
- Branch: South African Army; South African Army
- Type: Infantry
- Role: Light Infantry
- Size: One Battalion
- Part of: South African Infantry Corps; Army Territorial Reserve
- Garrison/HQ: Vrede

Vrede Commando was a light infantry regiment of the South African Army, forming part of the South African Army Infantry Formation as well as the South African Territorial Reserve.

== History ==
=== Origin ===
==== With the Orange Free State Republic ====
This Commando was involved in the following:

- The battle of Rietfontein took place on 24 October 1899 between six commandos of the Free State Army commanded by General A Piet Cronje and a British Flying Column dispatched from Ladysmith under the command of Sir George White.

The Free State forces consisted of the following commandos:

- Harrismith Commando,
- Kroonstad Commando,
- Winburg Commando,
- Bethlehem Commando,
- Vrede Commando and
- Heilbron Commando.

==== With the UDF ====
By 1902 all Commando remnants were under British military control and disarmed.

By 1912, however previous Commando members could join shooting associations.

By 1940, such commandos were under control of the National Reserve of Volunteers.

These commandos were formally reactivated by 1948.

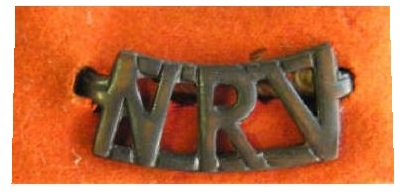
UDF era National Reserve of Volunteers shoulder tab

==== With the SADF ====
During this era the Commando was mainly tasked with area force protection, search and cordones as well as stock theft control to the rural police.

The unit resorted under the command of Group 24.

==== With the SANDF ====
===== Disbandment =====
This unit, along with all other Commando units was disbanded after a decision by South African President Thabo Mbeki to disband all Commando Units. The Commando system was phased out between 2003 and 2008 "because of the role it played in the apartheid era", according to the Minister of Safety and Security Charles Nqakula.

== Unit Insignia ==
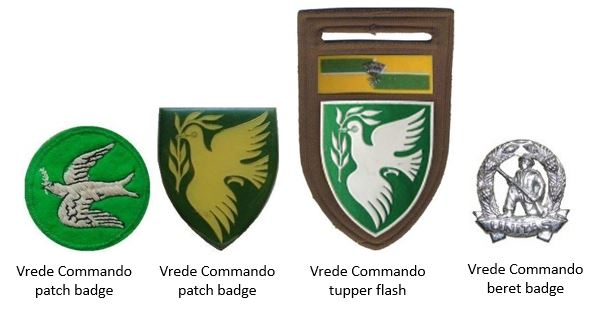
SADF Vrede Commando insignia

== Leadership ==
Leadership
From	Honorary Colonels	To	Ribbon
	No known incumbents		
From	Commanding Officers	To	Ribbon
	No known incumbents		
From	Regimental Sergeants Major	To	Ribbon
	No known incumbents		

== See also ==
- South African Commando System
