= Bloemfontein District Commando =

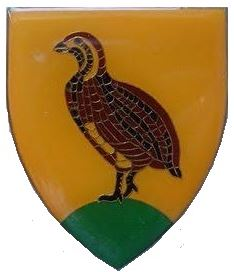
- Bloemfontein District Commando
- Disbanded: March 14, 2003 (23 years ago)
- Country: South Africa
- Allegiance: Republic of South Africa; Republic of South Africa
- Branch: South African Army; South African Army
- Type: Infantry
- Role: Light Infantry
- Size: One Battalion
- Part of: South African Infantry Corps; Army Territorial Reserve, Group 35
- Garrison/HQ: Bloemfontein
- Motto: Interritus (Fearless)

Bloemfontein District Commando was a light infantry regiment of the South African Army. It formed part of the South African Army Infantry Formation as well as the South African Territorial Reserve.

== History ==
=== Origins ===
==== Part of the Bloemfontein City Commando ====
This unit's predecessor had its origin around 1848 when Andries Pretorius called up a commando of about a 1000 men from the region of Bloemfontein, Caledon River and Winburg to defend the area against British ambitions and Basotho cattle theft.

The commando was reactivated formally around 1948. By 1956 however the unit was divided into two separate commandos one for the city, Bloemfontein City Commando and one for the rural areas.

==== With the SADF ====
As a rural commando this unit was now mainly tasked with area force protection, search and cordones as well as stock theft control assistance to the police.

The unit resorted under the command of Group 35.

==== With the SANDF ====
===== Disbandment =====
This unit, along with all other Commando units was disbanded after a decision by South African President Thabo Mbeki to disband all Commando Units. The Commando system was phased out between 2003 and 2008 "because of the role it played in the apartheid era", according to the Minister of Safety and Security Charles Nqakula.

== Unit Insignia ==
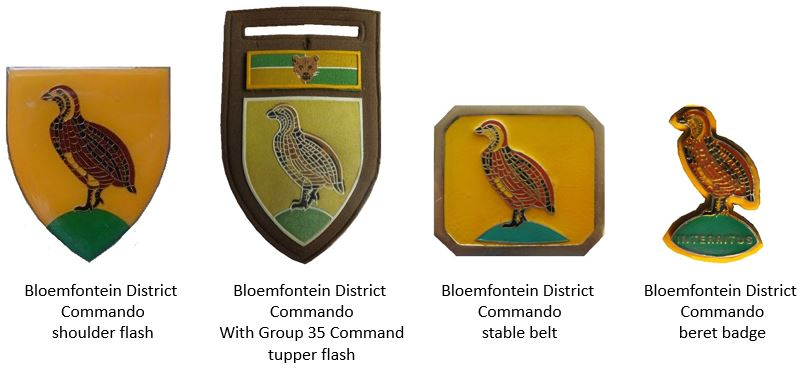
SADF era Bloemfontein District Commando insignia

== Leadership ==
Leadership
From	Honorary Colonels	To	Ribbon
	No known incumbents		
From	Commanding Officer	To	Ribbon
	No known incumbents		
From	Regimental Sergeant Major	To	Ribbon
	No known incumbents		

== See also ==
- South African Commando System
