= Regiment Universiteit Oranje-Vrystaat =

South African artillery regiment

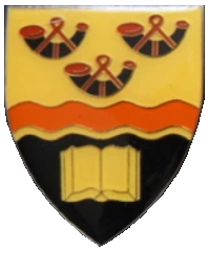
- Emblem of the Regiment Universiteit Oranje-Vrystaat
- Active: 1960 – c. 1974
- Country: South Africa
- Allegiance: Republic of South Africa
- Branch: South African Army
- Type: Artillery
- Size: Regiment
- Part of: South African Army Artillery Corps; Army Conventional Reserve
- Garrison/HQ: Pretoria

Insignia
- Collar Badge: Bursting grenade with seven flames
- Beret Colour: Oxford Blue
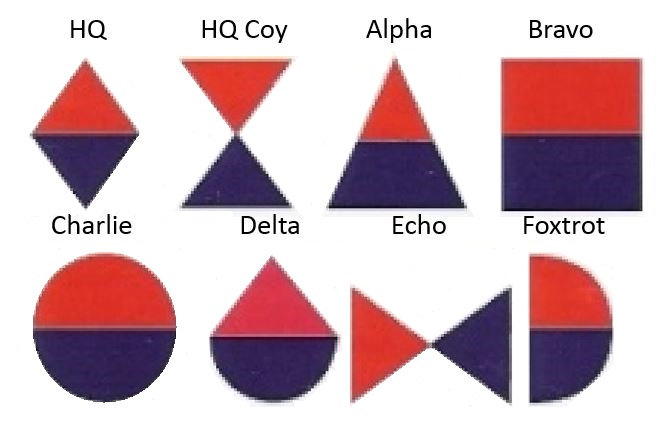
- Artillery Battery Emblems

- Artillery Beret Bar circa 1992

The Regiment Universiteit Oranje-Vrystaat (University of the Orange Free State Regiment) was an artillery regiment of the South African Artillery. As a reserve unit, it had a status roughly equivalent to that of a British Army Reserve or United States Army National Guard unit. It was part of the South African Army Artillery Corps.

== History ==
In the 1950s in South Africa, military units were attached to each large university. The University of the Orange Free State acquired an artillery capability. The concept was for long term students to complete their obligatory military training in these units. Training would also be organised so as not to unduly interfere with university work.

This unit could be considered an offshoot of the Regiment Potchefstroom Universiteit as that unit's Survey Battery was transferred to the University of the Orange Free State in the early 1950s.

A survey battery would set up the gun line for cannons through determining the horizontal and vertical locations of each piece so that plotting could occur on a firing chart and accurate data correlated.

Students completing their academic courses were transferred mainly to the Vrystaatse Artillerie Regiment, an active citizen force regiment which had a close association with the university.

This unit was finally amalgamated with 6 Field Regiment around 1974.

== Insignia ==
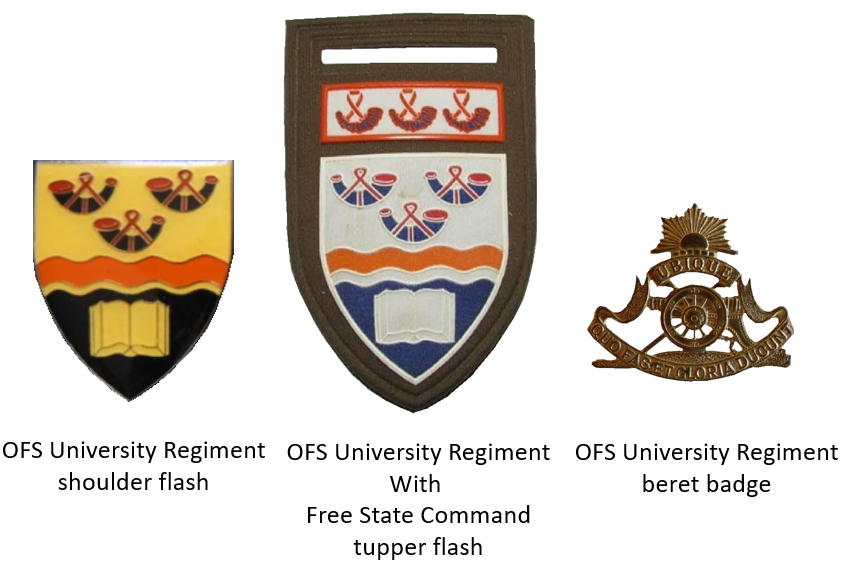
SADF era OFS University Regiment insignia
