= Phillipolis Commando =

Philipolis Commando
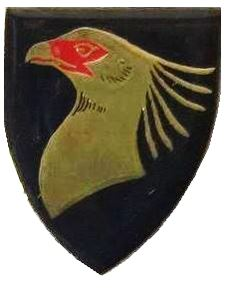
- Philippolis Commando emblem
- Country: South Africa
- Allegiance: Orange Free State Republic; Union of South Africa; Republic of South Africa; Republic of South Africa
- Branch: South African Army; South African Army
- Type: Infantry
- Role: Light Infantry
- Size: One Battalion
- Part of: South African Infantry Corps; Army Territorial Reserve, Group 26
- Garrison/HQ: Philippolis

Philipolis Commando was a light infantry regiment of the South African Army. It formed part of the South African Army Infantry Formation as well as the South African Territorial Reserve.

== History ==
=== Origin ===
==== With the Orange Free State Republic ====
With the outbreak of the Anglo Boer War, the republic activated this Commando.

This Commando considered of two was (veld cornetcies), Knapzakrivier led by a Commandant J.A.M. Hertzog and Dwarsrivier led by Commandant J.H. du Toit.

The combined unit engaged in the Battle of Stormberg as well as the Battle of Colesberg.

==== With the UDF ====
By 1902 all Commando remnants were under British military control and disarmed.

By 1912, however previous Commando members could join shooting associations.

By 1940, such commandos were under control of the National Reserve of Volunteers.

These commandos were formally reactivated by 1948.

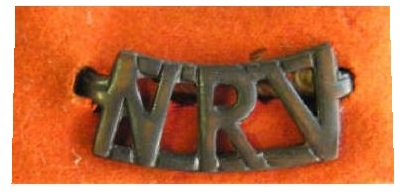
UDF era National Reserve of Volunteers shoulder tab

==== With the SADF ====
During this era, the unit was mainly used for area force protection, search and cordones as well as stock theft control assistance to the rural police.

This unit resorted under the command of Group 26.

==== With the SANDF ====
===== Disbandment =====
This unit, along with all other Commando units was disbanded after a decision by South African President Thabo Mbeki to disband all Commando Units. The Commando system was phased out between 2003 and 2008 "because of the role it played in the apartheid era", according to the Minister of Safety and Security Charles Nqakula.

== Unit Insignia ==
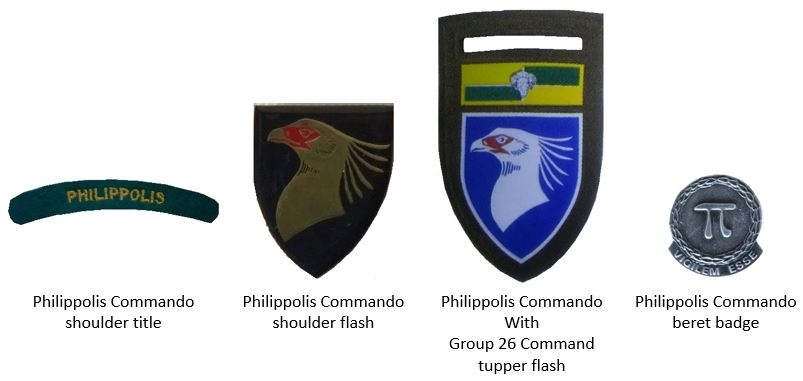
SADF era Philippolis Commando insignia

== See also ==
- South African Commando System
