= Swaershoek Pass =

Road in South Africa

Coordinates: 32°20′48.5″S 25°27′40.″E

Swaershoek Pass (literally: Brother-in-law's Corner Pass) is a gravel road in the Eastern Cape province of South Africa, on the regional road R337, between Nxuba and Pearston.

The gravel pass reaches an altitude of 1981 metres above sea level with maximum gradient of 1:12. It forms the third stage of the annual Nedbank Gravel Burn cycle race.
