= Bloemfontein City Commando =

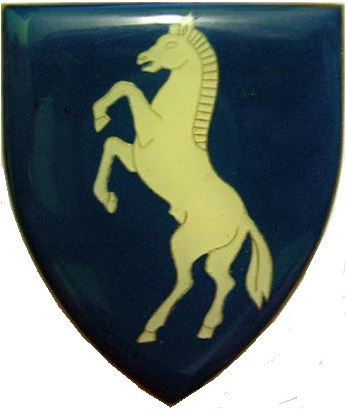
- Bloemfontein City Commando emblem
- Founded: March 8, 1848 (178 years ago)
- Disbanded: March 14, 2003 (23 years ago)
- Country: South Africa
- Allegiance: Orange River Sovereignty; Orange Free State Republic; Union of South Africa; Republic of South Africa; Republic of South Africa
- Branch: South African Army; South African Army
- Type: Infantry
- Role: Light Infantry
- Size: One Battalion
- Part of: South African Infantry Corps; Army Territorial Reserve, Group 35
- Garrison/HQ: Bloemfontein
- Motto: Floreat (Flourish)

Bloemfontein City Commando was a light infantry regiment of the South African Army. It formed part of the South African Infantry Corps as well as the South African Territorial Reserve.

== History ==
=== Origin ===
==== With the Orange River Sovereignty ====
On 8 March 1848, Sir Harry Smith issued a proclamation to activate a militia for the Sovereignty. From this, three military districts, namely Bloemfontein, Caledon River and Winburg, were formed.

==== With the Orange Free State Republic ====
With the departure of the British and proclamation of the Republic in 1854, the commandos were retained and regular shooting exercises were held in the districts.

===== Basotho Wars =====
Andries Pretorius called up a commando of about 1000 men from the regions of Bloemfontein, Caledon River and Winburg to defend the region against Basotho cattle theft.

===== Anglo Boer War =====
The commando was involved in the siege of Kimberley with an operation near Belmont on 23 November 1899.

During the guerilla phase of the war, the commando raided its own city's infrastructure under British control, namely Bloemfontein's water works.

The commando finally laid down its arms at Brandfort on 16 June 1902.

==== With the UDF ====
From 1902, all remnants of commandos had been placed under British military control and disarmed. By 1912 the commando existed solely as Shooting Association.

By 1940, this commando fell under the National Reserve of Volunteers.

The commando was reactivated formally around 1948.

By 1956 however, the unit was divided into two separate commandos one for the city and one for the rural areas, Bloemfontein District Commando.

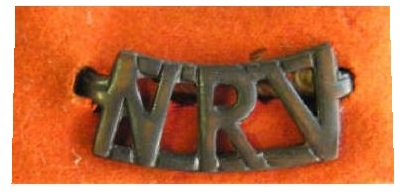
UDF era National Reserve of Volunteers shoulder tab

==== With the SADF ====
From 1968, the unit was being used in assisting urban policing.

By 1978, Bloemfontein City Commando had a platoon mainly made up of colored employees of the Musgrave weapons factory and by 1980 had a complement of around 30 men led by a white officer.

The unit was also used in the training of drivers for heavy trucks as well as securing the Lesotho border.

The unit conducted several tours in the South West African operational area around 1976 to 1982, but was mainly responsible for internal security and protection especially during the unrest in the 1980s.

The unit fell under the command of the SADF's Group 35.

==== With the SANDF ====
From 1994, the unit trained approximately 3000 coloured and black soldiers for the new Defence Force.

In 1998, the unit celebrated its 150th anniversary with a Colours parade at Tempe Stadium.

===== Disbandment =====
This unit, along with all other Commando units was disbanded after a decision by South African President Thabo Mbeki to disband all Commando Units. The Commando system was phased out between 2003 and 2008 "because of the role it played in the apartheid era", according to the Minister of Safety and Security Charles Nqakula.

== Unit Insignia ==
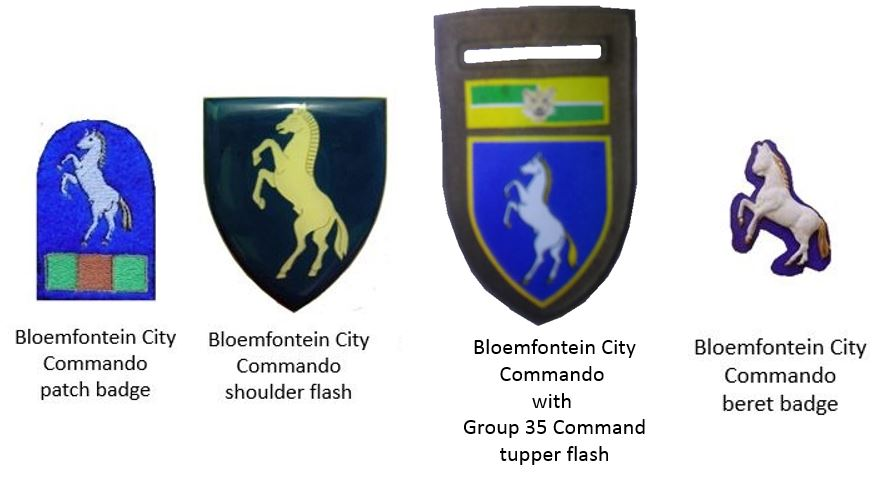
SADF era Bloemfontein City Commando insignia

== Leadership ==
Leadership
| From | Honorary Colonels | To | Ribbon |
|---|---|---|---|
| | No known incumbents | | |
| From | Commanding Officer | To | Ribbon |
| 1865 | Cmdt Louis Wessels | nd | |
| 1899 | Cmdt Piet Fourie | nd | |
| 1974 | Lt Col onel Herman Lotter | 1999 | |
| 1999 | Lt Col onel Paul Kruger | 2005 | |
| From | Regimental Sergeant Major | To | Ribbon |
| | No known incumbents | | |

== See also ==
- South African Commando System
