= Rouxville Commando =

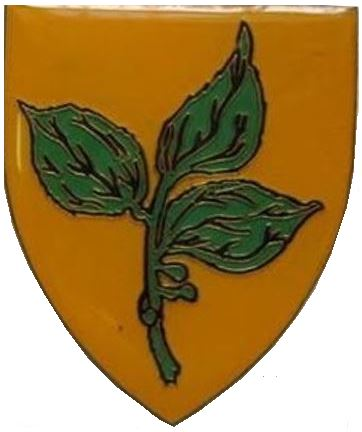
- Active: 1899-2003
- Country: South Africa
- Allegiance: Orange Free State Republic; Union of South Africa; Republic of South Africa; Republic of South Africa
- Branch: South African Army; South African Army
- Type: Infantry
- Role: Light Infantry
- Size: One Battalion
- Part of: South African Infantry Corps; Army Territorial Reserve
- Garrison/HQ: Rouxville, Free State

Rouxville Commando was a light infantry regiment of the South African Army. It formed part of the South African Army Infantry Formation as well as the South African Territorial Reserve.

== History ==
=== Origin ===
==== With the Orange Free State Republic ====
Rouxville Commando was with General de Wet during the battle of Sanna's Post outside Bloemfontein when seven guns and 117 wagons were captured from the British.

See: Battle of Sanna's Post

==== With the UDF ====
By 1902 all Commando remnants were under British military control and disarmed.

By 1912, however previous Commando members could join shooting associations.

By 1940, such commandos were under control of the National Reserve of Volunteers.

These commandos were formally reactivated by 1948.

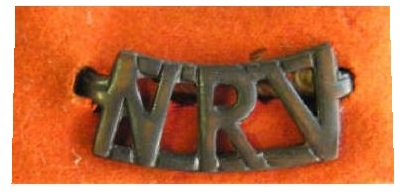
UDF era National Reserve of Volunteers shoulder tab

==== With the SADF ====
During this era, the unit was mainly involved in area force protection, cordones and search operations assisting the local police and stock theft control.

==== With the SANDF ====
===== Amalgamation =====
By 1997, Rouxville Commando amalgamated with Zastron Commando.

===== Disbandment =====
This combined unit, along with all other Commando units was disbanded after a decision by South African President Thabo Mbeki to disband all Commando Units. The Commando system was phased out between 2003 and 2008 "because of the role it played in the apartheid era", according to the Minister of Safety and Security Charles Nqakula.

== Leadership ==
Leadership
From	Honorary Colonels	To	Ribbon
	No known incumbents		
From	Commanding Officers	To	Ribbon
	No known incumbents		
From	Regimental Sergeants Major	To	Ribbon
	No known incumbents		

- Commandant J.H. Olivier 1899
- Commandant P.H. Kritzinger 1900

== See also ==
- South African Commando System
