= Winburg Commando =

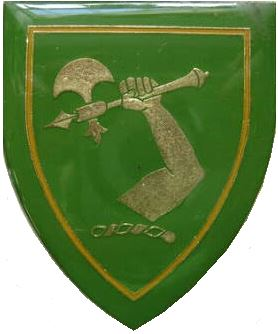
- Winburg Commando emblem in the South African National Defence Force (SANDF, 1994-)
- Active: 1899 - 2003
- Country: South Africa
- Allegiance: Orange Free State Republic; Union of South Africa; Republic of South Africa; Republic of South Africa
- Branch: South African Army; South African Army
- Type: Infantry
- Role: Light Infantry
- Size: One Battalion
- Part of: South African Infantry Corps; Army Territorial Reserve
- Garrison/HQ: Winburg, Free State

Winburg Commando was a light infantry regiment of the South African Army. It formed part of the South African Army Infantry Formation as well as the South African Territorial Reserve.

== History ==
=== Origin ===
==== With the Orange Free State Republic ====
In October 1899, President Marthinus Steyn of the Orange Free State ordered his commandants to muster all able bodied burgers in anticipation of war with the British. Marthinus Prinsloo was elected as commandant of Winburg.

On 9 October 1900 he occupied positions at Platberg Mountain near Harrismith. He was subsequently elected Chief Commandant of the Free State and then Helgard Theunissen was placed in command of the Winburg Commando. Note that Boer General Koos de la Rey was born in the district of Winburg on the farm Doornfontein. A subcommando of the Winburg Commando from Senekal began operating independently. Together these and other commandos invaded the Colony of Natal in the upper Tugela region.

(Transfer to the Western Front and the Battle of Paardeberg) The Winburg Commando was withdrawn from the Natal Front on 14 February 1900 and rushed to the Kimberley area to assist General Piet Cronje.

500 Boers from Heidelberg and Winburg Commandos attacked a koppie held by the Yorkshire Regiment and East Kent Regiment. The Boer forces were using this area as an escape route. Kommandant Helgaard Theunissen with 87 Winburgers held their ground until the main Boer forces reached safety and after a few hours surrendered to the British. At least 15 Winburgers were killed in this operation.

==== In the Union Defence Force (UDF, 1912-1957) ====
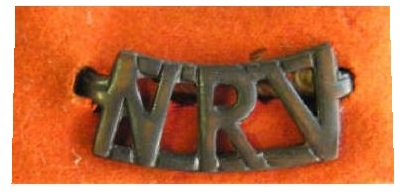
Union Defence Force era National Reserve of Volunteers (NRV) shoulder tab.

By 1902 all Commando remnants were under British military control and disarmed. By 1912, however previous Commando members could join shooting associations. By 1940, such commandos were under control of the National Reserve of Volunteers. These commandos were formally reactivated by 1948.

==== In the South African Defence Force (SADF, 1957-1994) ====
The majority of the commandos operations in this era was local area protection.

==== In the South African National Defence Force (SANDF, 1994-) ====
===== Disbandment =====
This unit, along with all other Commando units was disbanded after a decision by South African President Thabo Mbeki to disband all Commando Units. The Commando system was phased out between 2003 and 2008 "because of the role it played in the apartheid era", according to the Minister of Safety and Security Charles Nqakula.

== Leadership ==
Leadership
From	Honorary Colonels	To	Ribbon
	No known incumbents		
From	Commanding Officers	To	Ribbon
	No known incumbents		
From	Regimental Sergeants Major	To	Ribbon
	No known incumbents		

- Commandant Marthinus Prinsloo 1899
- Commandant Helgard Theunissen 1899

== See also ==
- South African Commando System
