= 17 Field Artillery =

17 Field Artillery Regiment
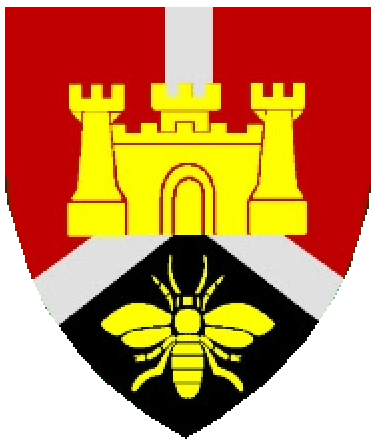
- 17 Field Artillery Regiment emblem
- Active: 1975–1991
- Country: South Africa
- Allegiance: Republic of South Africa
- Branch: South African Army
- Type: Regular artillery
- Role: Field Artillery
- Size: Regiment
- Part of: South African Army Artillery Corps; Army Conventional
- Garrison/HQ: Pretoria University of Pretoria Campus, Poynton Building
- Motto(s): Eminus Ferimus (From a distance)
- Engagements: South African Border War
- Battle honours: South West Africa
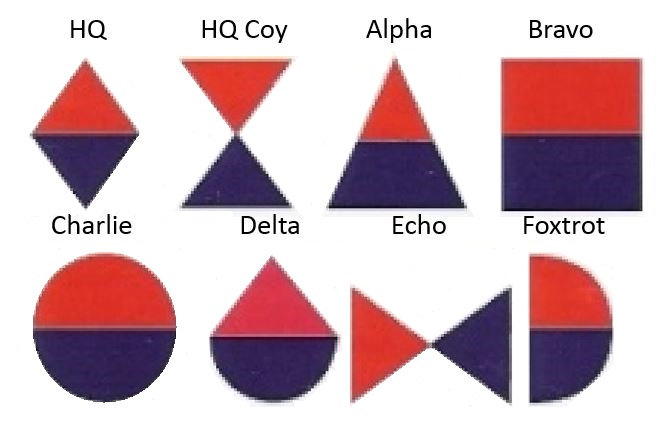
- Artillery Battery Emblems

- Artillery Beret Bar circa 1992

17 Field Artillery Regiment was a reserve South African Artillery unit.

== History ==
17 Field Artillery Regiment was formed in 1975 as a Citizen Force unit in Pretoria.

It was a new artillery counter-insurgency unit whose purpose was to provide support for 73 Motorised Brigade from 1975 to 1991. 17 Field Artillery also assisted 81 Armoured Brigade.

17 Field was originally an offshoot of the Regiment University of Pretoria.

17 Field Artillery was also known as the Pretoria Artillery.

=== Artillery Type ===
The term Field Regiment was not quite descriptive of this unit which comprised a number of artillery elements such as field guns, medium mortars and a locating artillery element being essentially radar. It could also be referred to as a composite regiment.

=== Operations ===
17 Field Regiment received indirect operational experience when it received experienced national servicemen returning from SWA and Angola. Members also did service as infantry in the operational area. The first actual operation duty for the regiment occurred in 1982 when a battery under command of Capt H.J. Bootha was sent to Sector 70. Another battery was sent as well to Sector 10 as Infantry to fill a strength requirement for the Brigade. A battery under Commandant Botha was also sent to the border in Sector 10 in 1988. The expected operation did however not occur.

17 Field Regiment was eventually amalgamated into the Transvaalse Staatsartillerie in October 1991.

=== Commanders ===
- Commandant M. van Rooyen
- Commandant K.R.W. Harrison
- Commandant A.H. van Tonder

=== Insignia ===
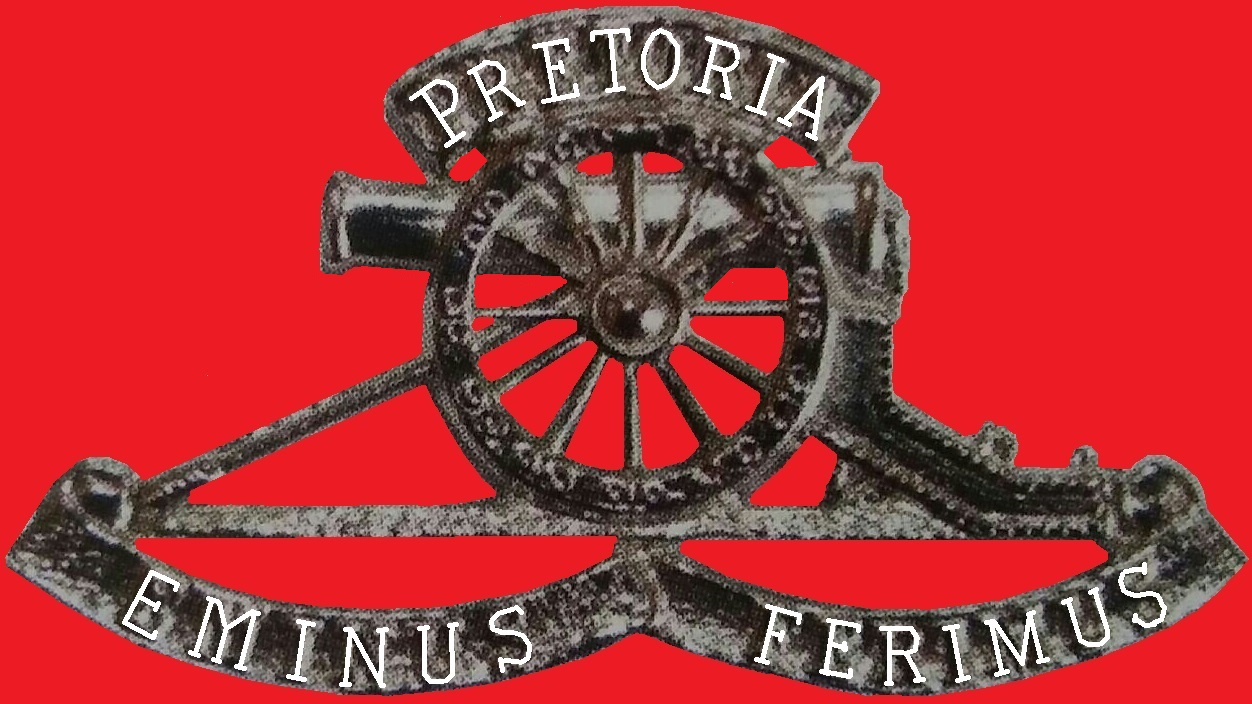
17 Field Regiment beret badge
