= Stellaland Commando =

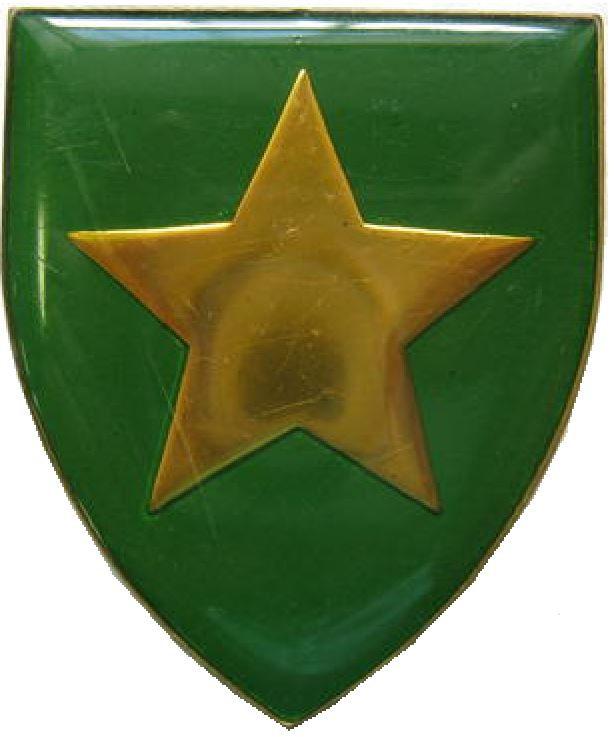
- Active: 1899-2006
- Disbanded: 21 January 2006
- Country: South Africa
- Allegiance: Republic of Stellaland; (South African Republic) Zuid Afrikaanse Republiek; Union of South Africa; Republic of South Africa; Republic of South Africa
- Branch: South African Army; South African Army
- Type: Infantry
- Role: Light Infantry
- Size: One Battalion
- Part of: South African Infantry Corps; Army Territorial Reserve
- Garrison/HQ: Vryburg

Stellaland Commando was a light infantry regiment of the South African Army. It formed part of the South African Army Infantry Formation as well as the South African Territorial Reserve.

== History ==
=== Origins ===
Stellaland Commando can trace its origins back to the declaration of the state of Stellaland.

=== Operations ===
==== With the Zuid Afrikaanse Republiek ====
The Stellaland Commando was originally mobilised on 21 October 1899 to relieve Kuruman from British occupation in the Anglo–Boer War.

By May 1900 however Vryburg was itself occupied by the British and the Stellaland Commando withdrew to form up with the Bloemhof Commando. Stellaland then became involved in a guerilla war and this resulted in the British policy of scorched earth in the region where many homesteads in and around Vryburg bore testimony to the onslaught.

During the guerilla phase of the Anglo Boer War, four members of the commando paid the highest price:

- Johannes Kuhn
- Hermanus Kuhn
- Johannes Jansen
- Hermanus Rautenbach

==== With the UDF ====
By 1902 all Commando remnants were under British military control and disarmed.

By 1912, however previous Commando members could join shooting associations.

By 1940, such commandos were under control of the National Reserve of Volunteers.

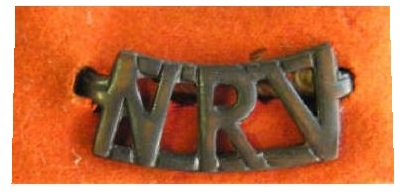
UDF era National Reserve of Volunteers shoulder tab

These commandos were formally reactivated by 1948.

==== With the SADF ====
During the Border War in South West Africa, the Stellaland Commando combined with commandos such as Kalahari, Bloemhof, Christiana, Schweizer-Reneke and De la Ray to form an operational company that was deployed to the Owamboland region.

The unit resorted under the command of the SADF's Group 21.

==== With the SANDF ====
===== Disbandment =====
This unit, along with all other Commando units was disbanded after a decision by South African President Thabo Mbeki to disband all Commando Units. The Commando system was phased out between 2003 and 2008 "because of the role it played in the apartheid era", according to the Minister of Safety and Security Charles Nqakula.

== SADF era Unit Insignia ==
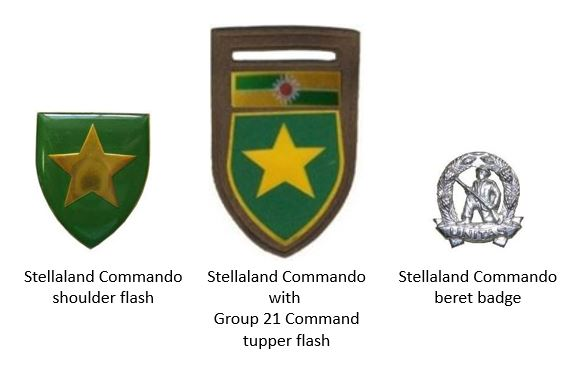
SADF era Stellaland Commando insignia

== Leadership ==
Leadership
From	Honorary Colonels	To	Ribbon
	No known incumbents		
From	Commanding Officers	To	Ribbon
1945	Cmdt P.D. Haasbroek	c. 1951	
16 October 1972	Cmdt R.F. de V du Plessis	c. 20 October 1981	
c. 2000	Lt Col Dick Wheeler	c. 2003	
From	Regimental Sergeants Major	To	Ribbon
	No known incumbents		

== See also ==
- South African Commando System
