= Fauresmith (disambiguation) =

Fauresmith may refer to:

- Fauresmith, a town in South Africa
- Fauresmith (industry), a culture of stone tools at the beginning of the Middle Stone Age some 420,000 years ago
- Fauresmith Commando, a light infantry regiment of the South African Army
