= 19 Rocket Regiment =

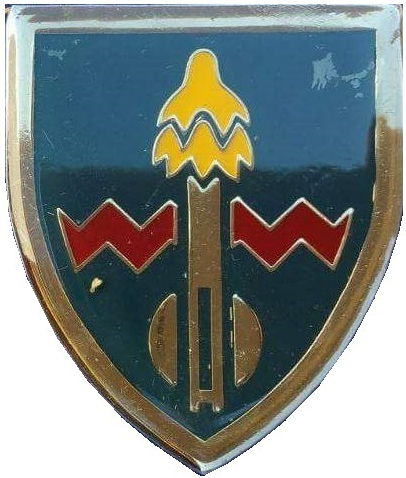
- 19 Rocket Regiment emblem
- Active: 1979
- Country: South Africa
- Allegiance: Republic of South Africa
- Branch: South African Army
- Type: Multiple Rocket Artillery
- Size: Regiment
- Part of: South African Army Artillery Corps; Army Conventional Reserve
- Garrison/HQ: Pretoria

Insignia
- Collar Badge: Bursting grenade with seven flames
- Beret Colour: Oxford Blue
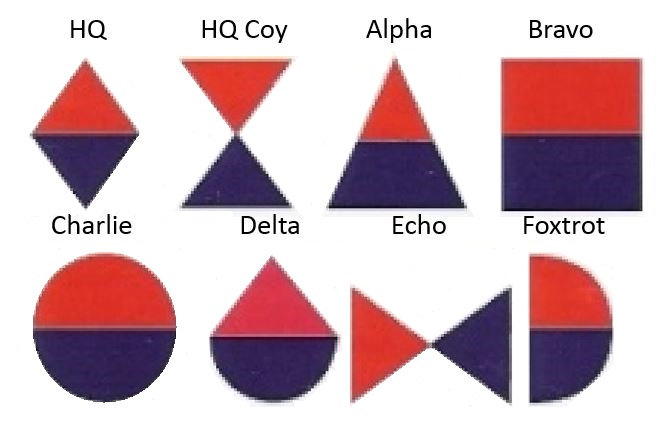
- Artillery Battery Emblems

- Artillery Beret Bar circa 1992

19 Rocket Regiment was a rocket artillery regiment of the South African Artillery.

== History ==
=== Origin ===
This Citizen Force Regiment was formed as 19 Missile Regiment on 1 January 1979 in Potchefstroom. Captured Soviet rocket artillery weapons allowed South Africa to develop its own rocket artillery systems. The introduction of rocket artillery such as the Valkiri launcher system activated the requirement for units such as this to train and then integrate into battlegroups. The Valkiri launcher first saw service in 1982.

=== Command ===
The regiment resorted originally under the Artillery School for administrative purposes. By 1963 the regiment was transferred to Eastern Transvaal Command, and again for administrative purposes it was then added to 26 Field Artillery Regiment. From 1986, the regiment finally operated independently. For conventional purposes the regiment was affiliated to 7 Infantry Division.

=== Weapons ===
19 Rocket Regiment comprised 191 Battery, utilizing the Valkiri in six launcher batteries. On 24 October 1984, Lance Bombardier Evans and Gunner English successfully fired the first rockets.

== Associated Units relationships ==
Batteries of this regiment were allocated to full-time regiments such as 32 Battalion and Transvaal State Artillery.

== Insignia ==
The regiment's insignia was approved in June 1986.

=== Dress Insignia ===
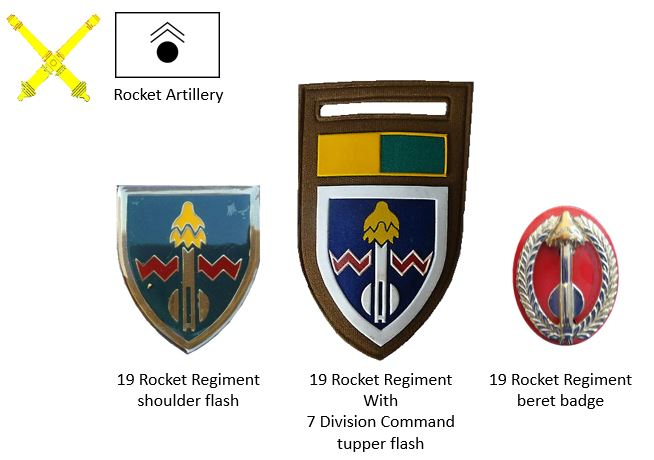
SADF era 19 Rocket Regiment insignia

== Amalgamated ==
Amalgamated into the Transvaal State Artillery.
