= Regiment University of Pretoria =

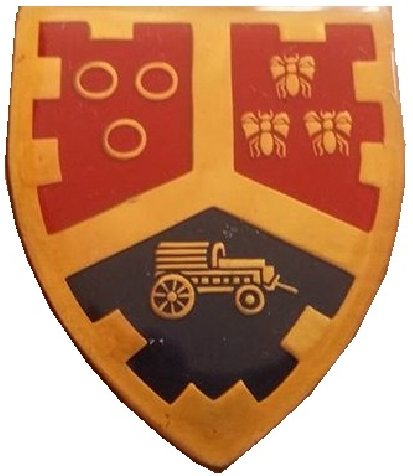
- Regiment University of Pretoria emblem
- Active: 1960-1974
- Country: South Africa
- Allegiance: Republic of South Africa
- Branch: South African Army
- Type: Artillery
- Size: Regiment
- Part of: South African Army Artillery Corps; Army Conventional Reserve
- Garrison/HQ: Pretoria

Insignia
- Collar Badge: Bursting grenade with seven flames
- Beret Colour: Oxford Blue
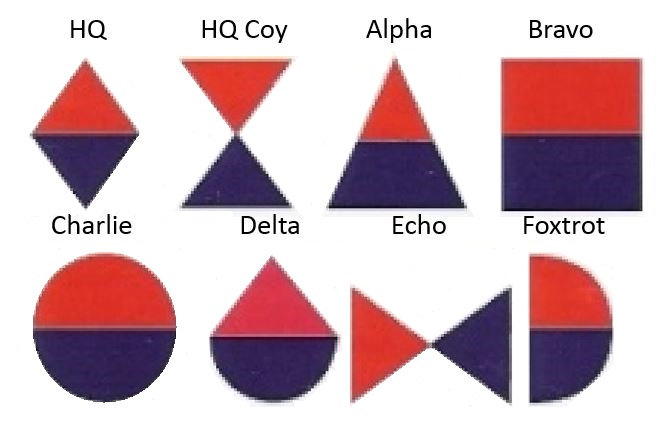
- Artillery Battery Emblems

- Artillery Beret Bar circa 1992

Regiment University of Pretoria was an artillery regiment of the South African Artillery. As a reserve unit, it had a status roughly equivalent to that of a British Army Reserve or United States Army National Guard unit. It was part of the South African Army Artillery Corps.

== Origin ==
In the 1950s in South Africa, military units were attached to each large university. The University of Pretoria acquired an artillery capability. The concept was for long term students to complete their obligatory military training in these units. Training would also be organised so as not to unduly interfere with university work.

=== 1 Observation Battery ===
On 1 May 1950 an observation and sound measurement battery affiliated to the existing 1 Observation Battery was established at the University of Pretoria under a Captain L.J. Le Roux.

By 1957 this battery was renamed P Battery. When 1 Observation Battery was divided on 1 January 1960, the elements at the university was renamed the Regiment University of Pretoria (SAA).

=== Association with 17 Field Artillery Regiment ===
On 1 February 1974, the Regiment was renamed 17 Field Artillery Regiment and ended its close association with the university.

== Insignia ==
=== Dress Insignia ===
The insignia in the middle depicts that of University of Pretoria Military Unit. UPMU formed circa 1981 and disbanded in circa 1990.

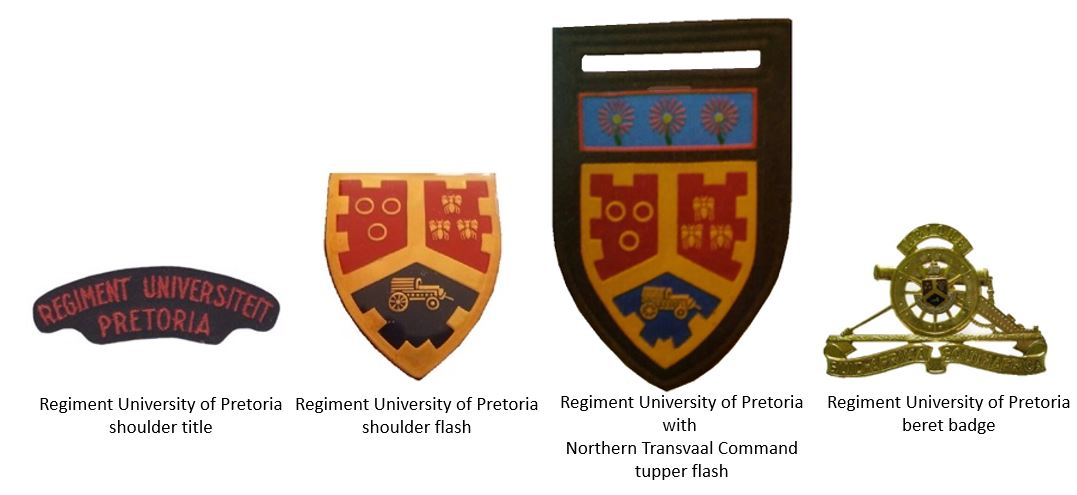
SADF era Regiment University of Pretoria insignia
