= Boshof Commando =

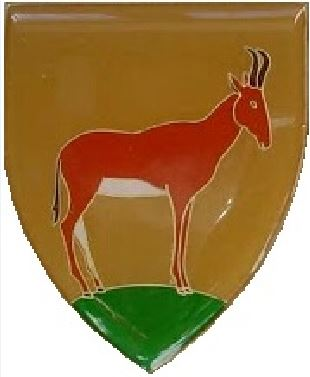
- Boshof Commando emblem
- Disbanded: March 14, 2003 (23 years ago)
- Country: South Africa
- Allegiance: Orange Free State Republic; Union of South Africa; Republic of South Africa; Republic of South Africa
- Branch: South African Army; South African Army
- Type: Infantry
- Role: Light Infantry
- Size: One Battalion
- Part of: South African Infantry Corps; Army Territorial Reserve
- Garrison/HQ: Boshof

Boshof Commando was a light infantry regiment of the South African Army. It formed part of the South African Army Infantry Formation as well as the South African Territorial Reserve.

== History ==
=== Origin ===
==== With the Orange Free State Republic ====
===== Anglo Boer War =====
This commando was involved in the siege of Kimberly in 1899.

==== With the SADF ====
This Commando was mainly used in this era for area force protection, search and cordons and stock theft control in assistance to the local police.

==== With the SANDF ====
===== Disbandment =====
This unit, along with all other Commando units was disbanded after a decision by South African President Thabo Mbeki to disband all Commando Units. The Commando system was phased out between 2003 and 2008 "because of the role it played in the apartheid era", according to the Minister of Safety and Security Charles Nqakula.

=== Insignia ===
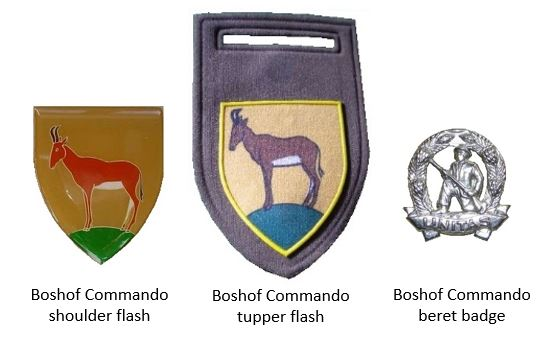
SADF era Boshof Commando insignia

== Leadership ==
Leadership
| From | Honorary Colonels | To | Ribbon |
|---|---|---|---|
| | No known incumbents | | |
| From | Commanding Officer | To | Ribbon |
| | No known incumbents | | |
| From | Regimental Sergeant Major | To | Ribbon |
| | No known incumbents | | |

== See also ==
- South African Commando System
