= Bloemhof Commando =

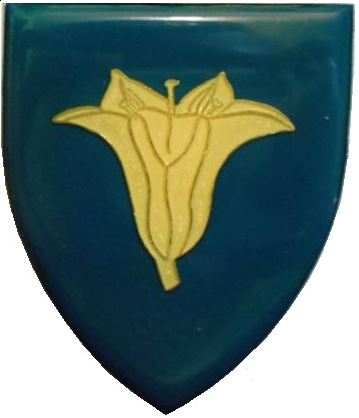
- Bloemhof Commando emblem
- Country: South Africa
- Allegiance: Republic of South Africa; Republic of South Africa
- Branch: South African Army; South African Army
- Type: Infantry
- Role: Light Infantry
- Size: One Battalion
- Part of: South African Infantry Corps; Army Territorial Reserve, Group 20
- Garrison/HQ: Bloemhof

Bloemhof Commando was a light infantry regiment of the South African Army. It formed part of the South African Army Infantry Formation as well as the South African Territorial Reserve.

== History ==
=== Origin ===
The Bloemhof Commando was originally established as a commando of the South African Republic (Transvaal)

==== During the Anglo Boer War for the ZAR Republic ====
This unit can trace its heritage to the Second Boer War, in which it fought under Commandant Tollie de Beer.

The commando had an initial strength of 737, and fought at:

- Fourteen Streams,
- Magersfontein,
- Kimberley,
- in Western Transvaal,
- Tweebosch, and
- Carter's Ridge. Together with its neighbouring commandos it was part of the force under Boer General de La Rey.

In 1901, this commando fell under the control of acting Assistant Commandant General Jan Smuts. It was reorganised with the remnants of other commandos after the Battle of Nooitgedacht.

A Commandant Tollie de Beer with the remaining 400 mounted men were instructed to continue to obstruct the Mafekeng line.

==== With the UDF ====
===== World War 1 =====
This commando was part of the South African Invasion of German South West Africa under the 1st Mounted Brigade led by Colonel Brits. A noteworthy engagement was the skirmishes around Husab.

The commando under Commandant Bezuidenhout was tasked to encircle the Schwarze Truppe.

==== With the SADF ====
===== Border War Operations =====
Although mainly used for area protection in the Western Transvaal, this commando together with Stellaland, Kalahari, Christiana, Schweizer-Reneke and De La Rey Commandos formed a joint operational company that was deployed to the Owamboland region in South West Africa.

The unit resorted under the command of the SADF's Group 20.

At the beginning of 1979, under then commander Cmdt van Rensburg, a group of Bloemhof commando soldiers did border duty in Owamboland within a company of Group 21.

==== With the SANDF ====
===== Disbandment =====
This unit, along with all other Commando units was disbanded after a decision by South African President Thabo Mbeki to disband all Commando Units. The Commando system was phased out between 2003 and 2008 "because of the role it played in the apartheid era", according to the Minister of Safety and Security Charles Nqakula.

== Unit Insignia ==
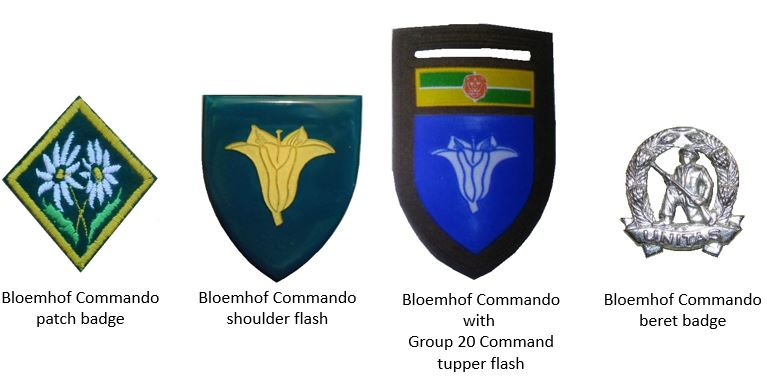
SADF era Bloemhof Commando insignia

== Leadership ==
Leadership
From	Honorary Colonels	To	Ribbon
	No known incumbents		
From	Commanding Officer	To	Ribbon
1901	Cmdt Tollie de Beer	c. nd	
1914	Cmdt Bezuidenhout	c. nd	
From	Regimental Sergeant Major	To	Ribbon
	No known incumbents		

== See also ==
- South African Commando System

Commanders after WW1:

1923 - 1930 N Strauss 1930 - 1944 K Moller 1944 - 1948 B Klopper 1948 - 1954 A Pretorius 1955 - 1962 J Jacobs 1962 - 1973 NP Muller 1973 - 1975 Hatting 1975 - 1990 JHJ van Rensburg 1990 - 1996 JD van Zyl 1996 - 2001 AB Muller 2001 - DJG de Beer
