= Lichtenburg Commando =

Light infantry regiment of the South African Army

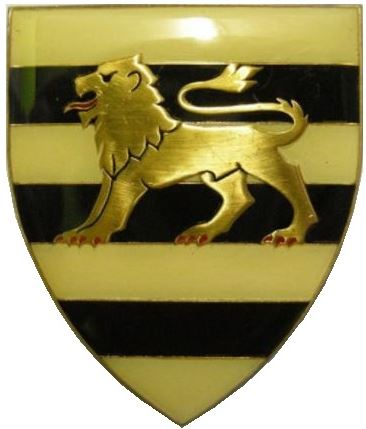
- Lichtenburg Commando emblem
- Country: South Africa
- Allegiance: (South African Republic) Zuid Afrikaanse Republiek; Union of South Africa; Republic of South Africa; Republic of South Africa
- Branch: South African Army; South African Army
- Type: Infantry
- Role: Light Infantry
- Size: One Battalion
- Part of: South African Infantry Corps; Army Territorial Reserve, Group 20
- Garrison/HQ: Lichtenburg
- Mascot: lion of the west

Lichtenburg Commando was a light infantry regiment of the South African Army. It formed part of the South African Army Infantry Formation as well as the South African Territorial Reserve.

== History ==
=== Operations ===
==== With the Zuid Afrikaanse Republiek ====
This Commando was involved in numerous engagements during the Anglo Boer War such as:

- Battle of Kraaipan in 12 October 1899, capturing a British garrison between Vryburg and Mafikeng.
- At Belmont, covering the retreat of General Prinsloo to Graspan
- Battle of Modder River, where trench warfare was first used in this war

During the guerilla phase of this war:

- Battle of Donkerhoek/ Battle of Diamond Hill in 11 to 12 June 1900.

==== With the UDF ====
By 1902 all Commando remnants were under British military control and disarmed.

By 1912, however previous Commando members could join shooting associations.

By 1940, such commandos were under control of the National Reserve of Volunteers.

These commandos were formally reactivated by 1948.

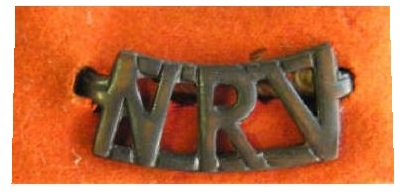
UDF era National Reserve of Volunteers shoulder tab

==== With the SADF ====
During this era, this commando was mainly used for area force protection, search and cordons as well as stock theft control assistance to the rural police.

The unit fell under the command of the SADF's Group 20.

==== With the SANDF ====
===== Disbandment =====
This unit, along with all other Commando units was disbanded after a decision by South African President Thabo Mbeki to disband all Commando Units. The Commando system was phased out between 2003 and 2008 "because of the role it played in the apartheid era", according to the Minister of Safety and Security Charles Nqakula.

== Unit Insignia ==
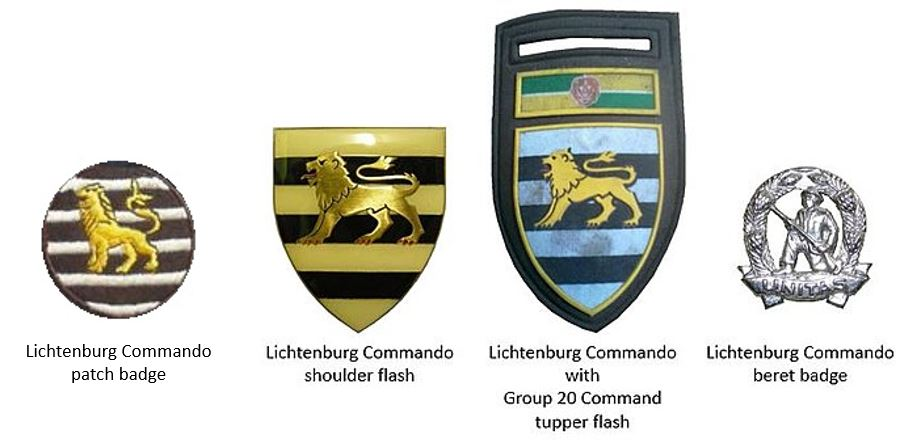
SADF era Lichtenburg Commando insignia

== Leadership ==
- 1885 Cmdt Koos de la Rey

== See also ==
- South African Commando System
