= Fauresmith Commando =

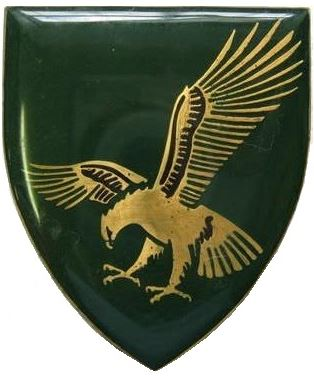
- Fauresmith Commando emblem
- Disbanded: March 14, 2003 (23 years ago)
- Country: South Africa
- Allegiance: Republic of South Africa; Republic of South Africa
- Branch: South African Army; South African Army
- Type: Infantry
- Role: Light Infantry
- Size: One Battalion
- Part of: South African Infantry Corps; Army Territorial Reserve, Group 25 and Group 36
- Garrison/HQ: Fauresmith

Commanders
- founding commander: Jan Jacobs

Fauresmith Commando was a light infantry regiment of the South African Army. It formed part of the South African Army Infantry Formation as well as the South African Territorial Reserve.

== History ==
=== Origin ===
==== With the SADF ====
During this era, this unit was primarily used for area force protection and stock theft control.

The unit resorted under the commands of Groups 25 and 36.

==== With the SANDF ====
===== Disbandment =====
This unit, along with all other Commando units was disbanded after a decision by South African President Thabo Mbeki to disband all Commando Units. The Commando system was phased out between 2003 and 2008 "because of the role it played in the apartheid era", according to the Minister of Safety and Security Charles Nqakula.

== Unit Insignia ==
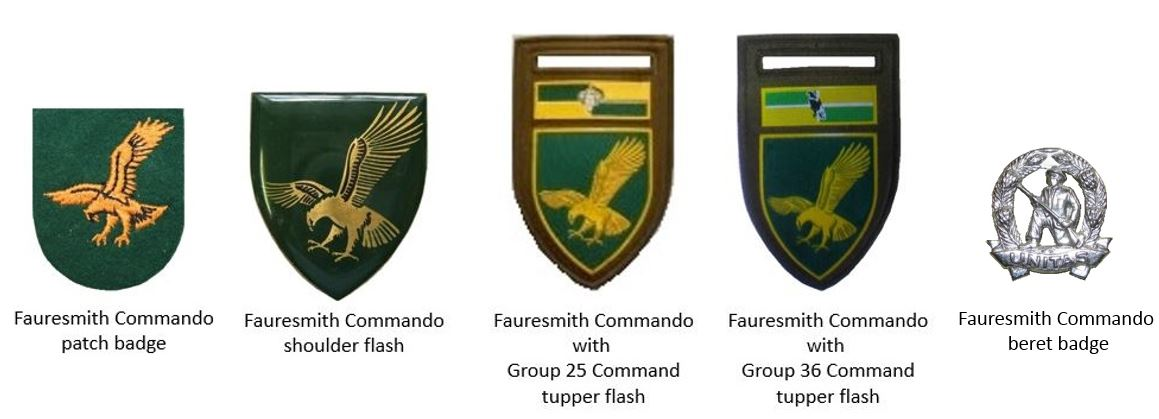
SADF era Fauresmith Commando insignia

== Leadership ==
Leadership
| From | Honorary Colonels | To | Ribbon |
|---|---|---|---|
| | No known incumbents | | |
| From | Commanding Officers | To | Ribbon |
| | No known incumbents | | |
| From | Regimental Sergeants Major | To | Ribbon |
| | No known incumbents | | |

== See also ==
- South African Commando System
