= State Artillery Regiment =

Transvaalse Staatsartillerie State Artillery Regiment
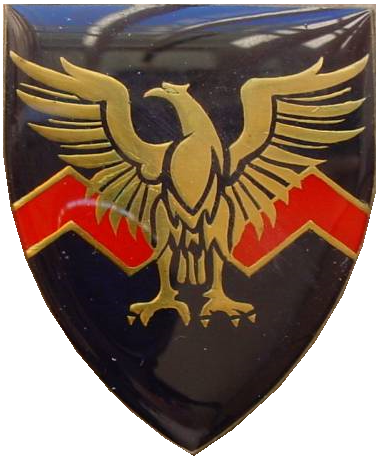
- SANDF Transvaal State Artillery emblem
- Active: 1898 to present
- Country: South Africa
- Allegiance: Zuid-Afrikaansche Republiek; Union/Republic of South Africa; Republic of South Africa
- Branch: South African Army; South African Army
- Type: Reserve Artillery
- Part of: South African Army Artillery Formation; Army Conventional Reserve
- Garrison/HQ: Pretoria
- Abbreviation: SAR

The State Artillery Regiment (formerly the Transvaalse Staatsartillerie) is a reserve artillery regiment of the South African Army.

== History ==
=== The original Transvaalse Staatsartillerie ===
The first attempt by the South African Republic (Zuid-Afrikaansche Republiek or ZAR) to form a professional full-time artillery unit was Batterij Dingaan (Dingaan Battery), which could be seen as the forerunner of the Transvaalse Staatsartillerie. The use of artillery pieces was not completely foreign to the Boers and that they had used the few that they had to great effect during some battles that occurred during the Great Trek. However, prior to the formation of Batterij Dingaan, all artillery units of the ZAR were part-time volunteers, organised under its commando system.

In 1874, President Thomas Francois Burgers purchased some artillery pieces, for the intended permanent artillery corps of the ZAR, in Europe and also recruited a number of European officers in order to assist in the organisation and development of this corps, due to the lack of adequately trained and experienced artillery officers in the ZAR. The first artillery pieces purchased were 4 Krupp 6,5 cm mountain guns and one obsolete French Mitrailleuse. The unit was commanded by Captain Otto Riedell, a former Austrian artillery officer. However, after the British annexation of the ZAR on 12 April 1877, Batterij Dingaan was disbanded. The members of the battery, most of who were not citizens of the ZAR, joined the three British volunteer corps, which had been created in order to assist the garrison with the defence of Pretoria.

Shortly after the British occupation of the ZAR ended in 1881, the executive council of the ZAR mandated the formation of the Artillerie Korps van de Zuid-Afrikaansche Republiek (Artillery Corps of the South African Republic). During the same year the executive council also mandated the formation of the Transvaalsche Rijdende Politie Korps (Transvaal Mounted Police Corps). This police force was amalgamated with the artillery corps in 1882 under the name of Transvaalsche Artillerie Corps (Transvaal Artillery Corps). However, this amalgamation was found to be unfeasible and the artillery and policing functions were subsequently separated again. The artillery formation was named the Staatsartillerie van de Zuid-Afrikaansche Republiek (State Artillery of the South African Republic) and had a strictly military function and structure.

Batteries of the Staatsartillerie went on to serve in the Malaboch War (1894) and the Mahoeba War (1894–1895).

=== After the Jameson Raid ===
After the Jameson Raid, the government of the ZAR decided to build a fort around the prison in Johannesburg (see Johannesburg Fort) as well as forts to defend Pretoria. In order to man these forts, the formation of a separate Vesting Artillerie (Fortress Artillery) was proposed. In 1898, despite some resistance to this idea (mainly because of the cost), the Volksraad approved increasing the manpower of the Staatsartillerie by 100 men in order to form the Corps Vesting Artillerie (Fortress Artillery Corps). This Corps was organised as an arm of the Staatsartillerie. By 1899 the Fortress Artillery Corps had grown to a unit with 9 officers and 148 men.

At this time, the Staatsartillerie was under the overall command of a lieutenant-colonel and was subdivided into several units, including:

- Field Artillery Corps
- Fortress Artillery Corps
- Telegraphic Section
- Medical Section
- Military Band

(The commanding officer of the Staatsartillerie was the sole person to hold the rank of lieutenant-colonel in the armed forces of the South African Republic. It was also the highest rank after the ZAR's Commandant-General.)

With the outbreak of the Anglo-Boer War, the unit was reorganised. The Fortress Artillery was disbanded and the Military band was redesignated as Medical assistants. The main armament of the Staatsartillerie consisted of C96 Krupp 77 mm Field guns, 75mm Creusot field guns, 37mm Vickers Maxim "Pom-Pom", 120mm Krupp Howitzers and the famous 4 155mm Creusot Fortress guns or "Long Toms". The unit was divided into four divisions and sent to Natal, Mafeking, Colesberg and Kimberley. The Natal Front guns was commanded by Lieutenant-Colonel S.P.E. Trichardt, the Kimberley guns by Lieutenant Arthur Carlblom, the Mafeking guns by Captain Piet van der Merwe and the Colesberg guns by Lieutenant Willem Baay. With the collapse of the Boer offensive, the Staatsartillerie retreated to the Free State in order to halt Lord Roberts' advance on Pretoria. After the capture of Pretoria, they retreated with the Boer forces to the Eastern Transvaal. Due to lack of ammunition and the changing Boer strategy, the guns were dumped in the Krokodil River or blown up at Komatipoort. They were reorganised as a mounted infantry unit.

=== During the Boer War ===
During the Boer War, the Staatsartillerie performed stellar service. They were the first modern artillery unit to use indirect fire (Battle of Dalmanutha 21–27 August 1900) and the first to use their guns as fire support to the infantry. Their outstanding service led to Winston Churchill to comment "these are the finest gunners in the world....they can teach the Royal Artillery a lesson or two."

It was not the Battle of Dalmanthutha where indirect was first used, – they did it first at Spioenkop (24 January 1900) and then at the Thukela Heights (12 to 27 February 1900) – six months earlier.

The British then started experimenting with it during the north bank operations of the Thukela Heights.

At Spioenkop, Cmdt Hendrik Prinsloo's signaller, Louis Bothma, signalled corrections from Aloe Knoll to Maj Francois Wolmarans at Louis Botha's HQ on Mt Alice. Wolmarans then relayed them to Lt von Wichmann and Lt Grothaus along the iNthabamnyama and to Gen Schalk Burger's Free State Krupp between the Twin Peaks.

The regiment ceased to exist at the end of the Anglo-Boer War, in 1902.

=== Re-emergence ===
More than half a century later, in 1954, a Citizen Force artillery regiment, named 9 Veldregiment (9 Field Regiment) was established in Pretoria. In 1960, it was renamed Transvaal Staatsartillerie, in honour of the old regiment.

=== Affiliated Divisions ===
During the Border War, the Transvaalse Staatsartillerie was affiliated with both 7 South African Infantry Division and 8th Armoured Division (South Africa):

=== Name Change ===
In August 2019, 52 Reserve Force units had their names changed to reflect the diverse military history of South Africa. The Transvaalse Staatsartillerie became the State Artillery Regiment, and have 3 years to design and implement new regimental insignia.

=== Commanders ===
- Lt Col Tinus van Antwerp (2010–Present)

=== Insignia ===
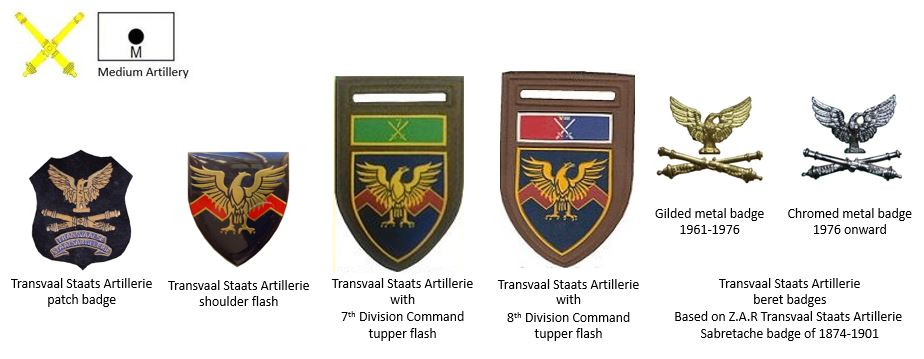
SADF era Transvaal Staats Artillerie insignia
