= List of South African Commando Units =

This is a list of the South African Commando Units. It includes some units which were created to assist in the training or support of the Commandos.

== Unit List ==
=== Group 1 ===
SA Commando Units
Unit	Area	Insignia
Group 1	(HQ Kelvin)	
GSB Youngsfield (10 x Commandos)
Two Oceans Commando	Cape Town	
Cape Flats Commando	Cape Town	Cape Flats Commando Insignia
False Bay Commando	Cape Town	False Bay Commando Insignia
Koeberg Commando	Cape Town	Koeberg Commando Insignia
Lions Head Commando	Cape Town	Lions Head Commando Insignia
Skiereiland Commando/Peninsula Commando	Cape Town	Skiereiland Commando Insignia
Tygerberg Commando	Cape Town	Tygerberg Commando Insignia
Wynberg Commando	Cape Town	Wynberg Commando Insignia

=== Group 2 ===
SA Commando Units
Unit	Area	Insignia
Group 2	(HQ Oudtshoorn)	
GSB Oudtshoorn (8 x Commandos)
Oudtshoorn Commando	Oudtshoorn	Oudtshoorn Commando Insignia
Worcester Commando		Worcester Commando Insignia

=== Group 3 ===
SA Commando Units
Unit	Area	Insignia
Group 3 (Note: Collapsed into other groups)
Alexander Bay Commando		Alexander Bay Commando Insignia
Springbok Commando		Springbok Commando Insignia

=== Group 4 ===
SA Commando Units
Unit	Area	Insignia
Group 4
Knysna Commando	Western Cape	Kynsna Commando Insignia
Mossel Bay Commando	Western Cape	Mossel Bay Commando Insignia
Outeniekwa Commando	Western Cape	Outeniekwa Commando Insignia
Riversdal Commando	Western Cape	Riversdal Commando Insignia
Klein Karoo Commando	Western Cape	Klein Karoo Commando Insignia

=== Group 5 ===
SA Commando Units
Unit	Area	Insignia
Group 5
Middel Karoo Commando		Middel Karoo Commando Insignia
De Aar Commando		De Aar Commando Insignia

=== Group 6 ===
SA Commando Units
Unit	Area	Insignia
Group 6	(HQ Port Elizabeth)	
GSB Port Elizabeth	15 x Commandos	
De Mist Commando/Uitenhage Commando		/
Donkin Commando		Donkin Commando emblem
Humansdorp Commando		Humansdorp Commando emblem
Kirkwood Commando		Kirkwood Commando emblem
Port Elizabeth Commando	Eastern Cape	Port Elizabeth Commando emblem
Recife Commando		Recife Commando emblem

=== Group 7 ===
SA Commando Units
Unit	Area	Insignia
Group 7	(HQ Grahamstown)	
Cradock Commando		Craddock Commando emblem
Katberg Commando		Katberg Commando emblem
Murraydeen Commando		Murraydeen Commando emblem
Somerset East Commando		Somerset East Commando emblem
Stormberg Commando		Stormberg Commando emblem
Midland Commando (Note: Previously Fort Beaufort Commando)		Midland Commando emblem

=== Group 8 ===
SA Commando Units
Unit	Area	Insignia
Group 8	(HQ East London)	
Cately Commando	East London	Cately Commando emblem
East London Commando	East London	East London Commando emblem

=== Group 9 ===
SA Commando Units
Unit	Area	Insignia
Group 9	(HQ Pietermaritzburg)	
GSB Pietermaritzburg (5 x Commandos)
Pietermaritzburg Commando/Natalia Regiment		Regiment Natalia emblem
Umkomaas Commando		Commando Umkomaas shoulder flash
Umvoti Commando	Durban (Note: Part of Natal Command in late 1970s.)	Umvoti Commando emblem
Midmar Commando		Midmar Commando emblem
Weenen-Kliprivier Commando		Weenen Kliprivier emblem
Griqualand-East Commando		Griqualand East emblem.

=== Group 10 ===
SA Commando Units
Unit	Area	Insignia
Group 10	(HQ Montclair, Durban)	
GSB Durban (6 x Commandos)
Bluff Commando
Highway Commando
Umgeni Commando
Durban South Commando
Durban North Commando
South Coast Commando
Oribi Commando

=== Group 11 ===
SA Commando Units
Unit	Area	Insignia
Group 11	(HQ Dundee)	
Drakensberg Commando
Dundee and District Commando

=== Group 12 ===
SA Commando Units
Unit	Area	Insignia
Group 12	(HQ Ermelo)	
GSB Nelspruit (11 x Commandos)
Bethal Commando
Ermelo Commando
Piet Retief Commando
Secunda Commando
Standerton Commando
Volksrust Commando
Wakkerstroom Commando

=== Group 13 ===
SA Commando Units
Unit	Area	Insignia
Group 13
Letaba Commando
Phalaborwa Commando

=== Group 14 ===
SA Commando Units
Unit	Area	Insignia
Group 14	(HQ Pietersburg)	
GSB Pietersburg (7 x Commandos)
Pietersburg Commando
Limpopo Commando(SMA)
Magdol Commando
Soutpansberg Commando(SMA)
Thabazimbi Commando
Warmbad Commando
Waterberg Commando Nylstroom
Potgietersrus Commando

=== Group 15 ===
SA Commando Units
Unit	Area	Insignia
Group 15	(HQ Thaba Tshwane)	
GSB Thaba Tshwane (6 x Commandos)
Broederstroom Commando
Bronkhorstspruit Commando
Hercules Commando
Hillcrest Commando
Irene Commando
Moot Commando
Munitoria Commando
Pretoria East Commando
Quaggapoort Commando
Schanskop Commando
Wonderboom Commando

=== Group 16 ===
SA Commando Units
Unit	Area	Insignia
Group 16	(HQ Marievale)	
GSB Johannesburg (8 x Commandos)
Delmas Commando
Heidelberg Commando
Nigel Commando
Springs Commando

=== Group 17 ===
SA Commando Units
Unit	Area	Insignia
Group 17	(HQ Midvaal)	
SASOL Commando
Regiment Sasolburg
Iscor Commando
Krugersdorp Commando
Meyerton Commando
Vaal Commando
Vanderbijl Commando
Vereeniging Commando

=== Group 18 ===
SA Commando Units
Unit	Area	Insignia
Group 18	(HQ Doornkop)	
GSB Johannesburg (11 x Commandos)
East Park Commando
Johannesburg East Commando
Johannesburg West Commando
Randburg Commando
Roodepoort Commando
Wemmerpan Commando
West Rand Commando

=== Group 19 ===
SA Commando Units
Unit	Area	Insignia
Group 19
Brits Commando
Koster Commando
Rustenburg Commando
Zeerust Commando

=== Group 20 ===
SA Commando Units
Unit	Area	Insignia
Group 20	(HQ Mmabatho)	
GSB Potchefstroom (9 x Commandos)
Bloemhof Commando
Christiana Commando
Coligny Commando
Lichtenburg Commando
Marico Commando
Ottosdal Commando
Schweizer Reineke Commando

=== Group 21 ===
SA Commando Units
Unit	Area	Insignia
Group 21
Kalahari Commando
Kuruman Commando
Mafikeng Commando
Stellaland Commando
Iscor Sishen Commando

=== Group 22 ===
SA Commando Units
Unit	Area	Insignia
Group 22	(HQ Diskobolos)	
GSB Kimberley (10 x Commandos)
11 Commando		11 Commando Insignia
Barkly West Commando
Herbert Commando
Hopetown Commando
Kimberley Commando
Karoo Commando
Vaalharts Commando
Victoria West Commando

=== Group 23 ===
SA Commando Units
Unit	Area	Insignia
Group 23	(HQ Upington)	
GSB Lohathla (7 x Commandos)
Boegoeberg Commando
Gordonia Commando
Kakamas Commando
Hay Commando
Orania Commando
Prieska Commando

=== Group 24 ===
SA Commando Units
Unit	Area	Insignia
Group 24	(HQ Kroonstad)	
GSB Kroonstad (17 x Commandos)
Heilbron Commando
Hoopstad Commando
Koppies Commando
Kroonstad Commando
Lindley Commando
Parys Commando
SASOL Commando
Regiment Sasolburg
Senekal Commando
Virginia Commando
Vrede Commando

=== Group 25 ===
SA Commando Units
Unit	Area	Insignia
Group 25	(HQ Bethlehem)	
Bethlehem Commando
Frankfort Commando
Harrismith Commando
Reitz Commando

=== Group 26 ===
SA Commando Units
Unit	Area	Insignia
Group 26	(HQ, Jacobsdal)	
Jacobsdal Commando
Phillipolis Commando
Rouxville Commando
Winburg Commando
Zastron Commando

=== Group 27 ===
SA Commando Units
Unit	Area	Insignia
Group 27	(HQ Eshowe)	
GSB Ladysmith (5 x Commandos)
Drakensberg Commando	Kwa-Zulu Natal	Drakensberg Commando Insignia
Dundee and District Commando	Kwa-Zulu Natal	Dundee and District Commando Insignia
Pongola Commando	Kwa-Zulu Natal	Pongola Commando Insignia
Tugela Commando	Durban	Tugela Commando Insignia
Insele Commando (Note: Originally named Empangeni/Richards Bay Commando. The unit was renamed Insele Commando on March 2, 1981 (44 years ago))	Kwa-Zulu Natal	Insele Commando Insignia
Northern Natal Commando	Kwa-Zulu Natal	
Umkhombe Commando	Kwa-Zulu Natal	Umkhombe Commando Insignia

=== Group 28 ===
SA Commando Units
Unit	Area	Insignia
Group 28
Belfast Commando
Carolina Commando
Loskop Commando
Middelburg Commando
Witbank Commando

=== Group 29 ===
SA Commando Units
Unit	Area	Insignia
Group 29
Kudusrand Commando	Limpopo	Kudusrand Commando Insignia
Northam Commando	Limpopo	Northam Commando Insignia

=== Group 30 ===
SA Commando Units
Unit	Area	Insignia
Group 30	(HQ Potchefstroom)	
GSB Potchefstroom (12 x Commandos)
Potchefstroom Commando
Cachet Commando
Delareyville Commando
Gatsrand Commando
Hartbeesfontein Commando
Klerksdorp Commando
NASChem Commando
Orkney Commando/Noordvaal Commando
Ventersdorp Commando
Wolmaransstad Commando

=== Group 31 ===
SA Commando Units
Unit	Area	Insignia
Group 31	(HQ Wellington)	
Caledon Commando
Calvinia Commando
Hantam Commando
Paarl Commando
Stellenbosch Commando
Swellendam Commando
Winterberg Commando
Worcester Commando

=== Group 32 ===
SA Commando Units
Unit	Area	Insignia
Group 32	(HQ Graaff-Reinet)	
Amatola Commando
Graaff-Reinet Commando

=== Group 33 ===
SA Commando Units
Unit	Area	Insignia
Group 33	(HQ Nelspruit)	
GSB Nelspruit (8 x Commandos)
Barberton Commando
Nelspruit Commando
Kruger National Park Commando
Lebombo Commando
Long Tom Commando
Lydenburg Commando
Whiteriver Commando

=== Group 34 ===
SA Commando Units
Unit	Area	Insignia
Group 34	(HQ Welkom)	
Bothaville Commando
Bultfontein Commando
Odendaalsrus Commando
Theunissen Commando
Sandrivier Commando
Goudveld Commando

=== Group 35 ===
SA Commando Units
Unit	Area	Insignia
Group 35	(HQ Bloemfontein)	
Bloemfontein City Commando		SADF era Bloemfontein City Commando emblem
Bloemfontein District Commando		SADF era Bloemfontein District Commando emblem
Boshof Commando		SADF era Boshof Commando emblem
Brandfort Commando		SADF era Brandfort Commando emblem
Edenburg Commando		SADF era Edenburg Commando emblem
Ficksburg Commando		SADF era Ficksburg Commando emblem
Smithfield Commando		SADF era Smithfield Commando emblem
University OFS Commando		
Wepener Commando		SADF era Wepener Commando emblem
Fouriesburg Commando		SADF era Fouriesburg Commando emblem

=== Group 36 ===
SA Commando Units
Unit	Area	Insignia
Group 36	(HQ Tempe/Ladybrand)	
GSB Bloemfontein (16 x Commandos)
Caledon River Commando		SADF era Caledon River Commando emblem
Fauresmith Commando		SADF era Fauresmith Commando emblem.
Ladybrand Commando		SADF era Ladybrand Commando emblem
Senekal Commando		SADF era Senekal Commando emblem

=== Group 39 ===
SA Commando Units
Unit	Area	Insignia
Group 39	(HQ Queenstown)	
Aliwal North Commando		Commando Aliwal North shoulder flash
Barkly East Commando		SADF era Barkly East Commando emblem
Queenstown Commando		SADF era Queenstown Commando emblem

=== Group 40 ===
SA Commando Units
Unit	Area	Insignia
Group 40	(HQ Wingsfield)	
Clanwilliam Commando		Clanwilliam Commando Emblem
Piketberg Commando		Piketberg Commando emblem
Swartland Commando		SADF era Swartland Commando emblem
Van Rhynsdorp Commando		SADF era Commando Van Rynsdorp emblem
West Coast Commando		SADF era West Coast Commando emblem

=== Group 41 ===
SA Commando Units
Unit	Area	Insignia
Group 41	(HQ Primrose)	
Atlas Commando	Transvaal	Atlas Commando Insignia
Benoni Commando	Transvaal	Benoni Commando Insignia
Brakpan Commando	Transvaal	Brakpan Commando Insignia
Boksburg Commando	Transvaal	Boksburg Commando Insignia
Germiston Commando	Transvaal	Germiston Commando Insignia
Kempton Park Commando	Transvaal	Kempton Park Commando Insignia

=== Group 42 ===
SA Commando Units
Unit	Area	Insignia
Group 42	(HQ Lenz)	
Alberton Commando		Alberton Commando Insignia
Edenvale Commando (Note: Also Rietfontein Commando?)	(Note: Possibly under Group 41)	Edenvale Commando Insignia
Modderfontein Commando		Modderfontein Commando Insignia
Sandton Commando (Note: Previously West Park Commando)		Sandton Commando Insignia
West Park Commando (Note: Renamed Sandton Commando)		

=== Group 46 ===
SA Commando Units
Unit	Area	Insignia
Group 46	(HQ Umtata)	
GSB Port Elizabeth (7 x Commandos)

=== Group 50 ===
SWATF Area Force Units
Unit	Area	Insignia
Group 50		
Alte Feste Commando (SWATF)	Namibia	Alte Feste Commando Insignia
Bo-Nossob Commando (SWATF)	Namibia	Bo-Nossob Commando Insignia
Etosha Commando (SWATF)		Etosha Commando Insignia
Grootfontein Commando (SWATF)		Grootfontein Commando Insignia
Keetmanshoop Commando (SWATF)		Keetmanshoop Commando Insignia
Maltahohe Commando (SWATF)		Maltahohe Commando Insignia
Mariental Commando (SWATF)		Mariental Commando Insignia
Otjiwarongo Commando (SWATF)		Otjiwarongo Commando Insignia
Outjo Commando (SWATF)		Outjo Commando Insignia
Walvis Bay Military Area
Walvis Bay Commando	Walvis Bay	Walvis Bay Commando Insignia

=== Unsorted ===
SA Commando Units
Unit	Area	Insignia
Unsorted
Danie Theron Combat School	Northern Cape	Danie Theron Combat School Insignia
South West Karoo Commando	South West Karoo	
Stormrivier Commando	Western Cape	
