= Walvis Bay Military Area =

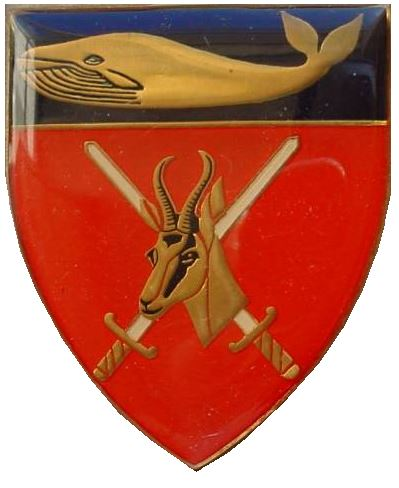
- Walvis Bay Military Area emblem
- Disbanded: early 1994
- Country: South Africa
- Allegiance: South Africa
- Branch: South African Army
- Type: Militarised Area
- Part of: Chief of the Army
- Garrison/HQ: Walvis Bay, Cape Province Enclave
- Engagements: South African Border War

The Walvis Bay Military Area was a specific militarised zone bordering South West Africa during the South African Border War. Military equipment was freighted through the harbour to support operations throughout South West Africa.

== History ==
Walvis Bay was managed as a South African enclave for eighty-four years. The Walvis Bay Military Area, with ten other regional Commands of South Africa, made up the Territorial Force of the South African Defence Force.

Based in Walvis Bay, this Command was responsible for the security of the enclave, forming the primary level of command for military operations.

This Command also provided logistic, administrative and service support to units and formations operating in its area of responsibility.

- 2 South African Infantry Battalion Group was based here and was often used in operations.

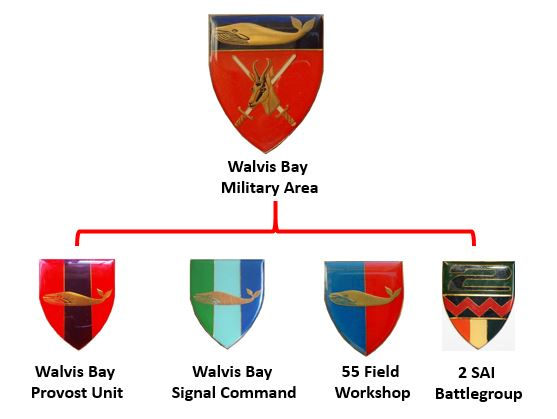
SADF Walvis Bay Command Structure

- The main base of the military area, Rooikop was situated further inland due to problems with corrosion on equipment closer to the shore.
- The military area also housed a large airfield called Air Force Base Rooikop. Both the harbor and the airfield were used in large scale equipment and personnel movement.
- During its history, other major units such as 4 South African Infantry Battalion Group and 61 Mech Battle Group was also billeted here.

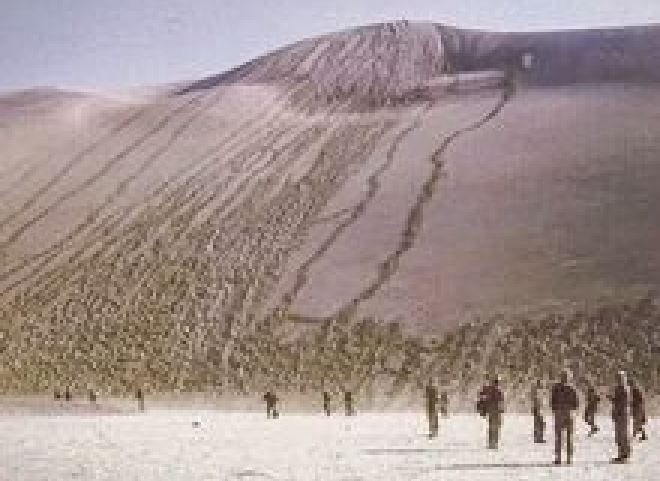
SADF 2 SAI exercise on Dune 7

- The local populace of Walvis Bay was militarised through a South African Citizen Force commando unit, known as the Walvis Bay Commando.

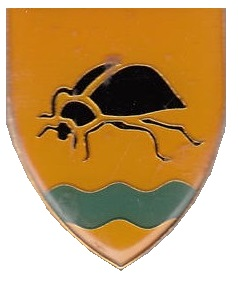
SADF Walvis Bay Commando

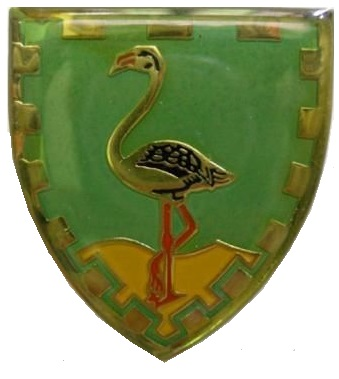
AFB Rooikop

=== Leadership ===
Col J. van Schalkwyk

== Handover to Namibia ==
By 1990, South West Africa gained independence as Namibia, but Walvis Bay remained under South African sovereignty, with South Africa increasing its number of troops, mainly due to units returning from Namibia.

By 1992 however, the two countries agreed to establish a transitional Joint Administrative Authority for Walvis Bay and the Offshore Islands.

In August 1993, South Africa passed a resolution calling for "the incorporation-reintegration of Walvis Bay and the Off-Shore Islands into Namibia."

The Transfer of Walvis Bay to Namibia Act was passed by the South African government that year.

Following the signing of a treaty between the two countries, South Africa formally transferred sovereignty of Walvis Bay to Namibia on 1 March 1994. The process of removing South African military assets from Walvis Bay was completed by then.
