= Maltahohe Commando =

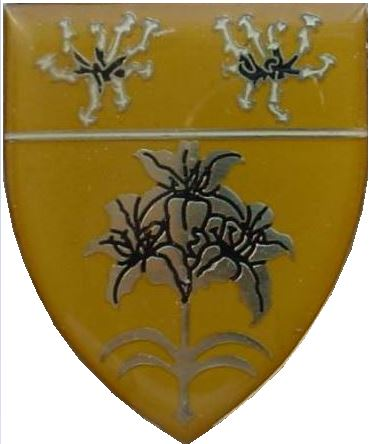
- Maltahohe Commando / Area Force Unit emblem
- Disbanded: December 1988 (37 years ago)
- Country: Republic of South Africa
- Allegiance: Republic of South Africa
- Branch: South African Army
- Type: Infantry
- Role: Light Infantry
- Size: One Battalion
- Part of: South West Africa Territorial Force; Army Territorial Reserve
- Garrison/HQ: Maltahohe, South West Africa, now Namibia

Maltahohe Commando was a light infantry regiment of the South West Africa Territorial Force. It formed part of the Area Force Units as well as the Territorial Reserve.

== History ==
=== Origin ===
Maltahohe Commando was one of 26 Area Force Units, similar to the localised territorial force concept of area bound commandos in South Africa. These units were set in particular sectors of South West Africa mainly from the farming community.

=== Operations ===
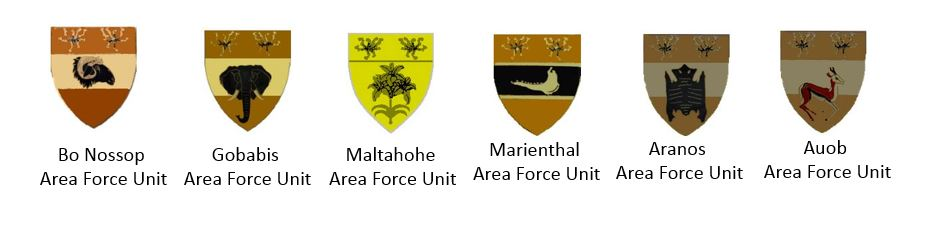
Maltahohe AFU with other SWATF Sector 50 Area Force Units

=== Disbandment ===
This unit, along with all other South West Africa Territorial Force units was disbanded with the independence of Namibia from South Africa and was announced around December 1988.

== See also ==
- South African Commando System
