= Goudveld Commando =

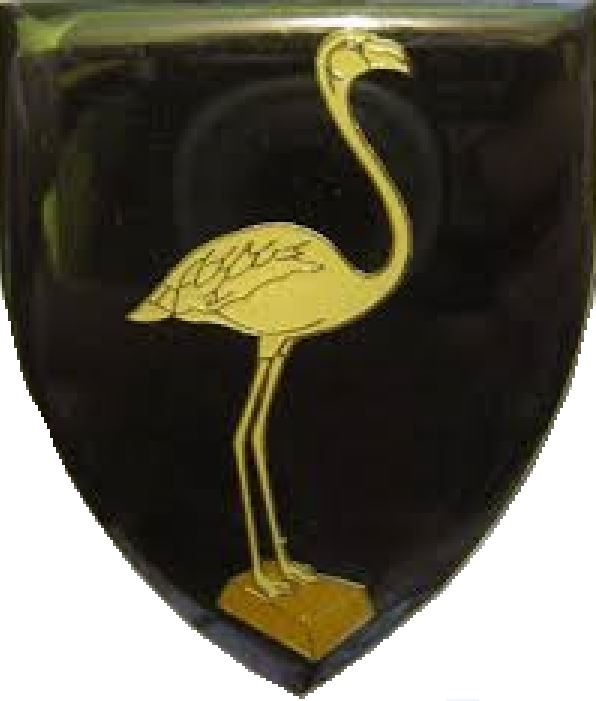
- Country: South Africa
- Allegiance: Republic of South Africa; Republic of South Africa
- Branch: South African Army; South African Army
- Type: Infantry
- Role: Light Infantry
- Size: One Battalion
- Part of: South African Infantry Corps; Army Territorial Reserve, Group 34
- Garrison/HQ: Welkom Northern Free State

Goudveld Commando was a light infantry regiment of the South African Army. It formed part of the South African Army Infantry Formation as well as the South African Territorial Reserve.

== History ==
=== Origins ===
This unit was situated adjacent the Welkom Airport.

=== Operations ===
==== With the SADF ====
During this era, this commando was mainly used for area force protection, search and cordons as well as stock theft control assistance to the rural police.

The unit resorted under the command of the SADF's Group 34 and later Group 24.

==== With the SANDF ====
===== Disbandment =====
This unit, along with all other Commando units was disbanded after a decision by South African President Thabo Mbeki to disband all Commando Units. The Commando system was phased out between 2003 and 2008 "because of the role it played in the apartheid era", according to the Minister of Safety and Security Charles Nqakula.

== Insignia ==
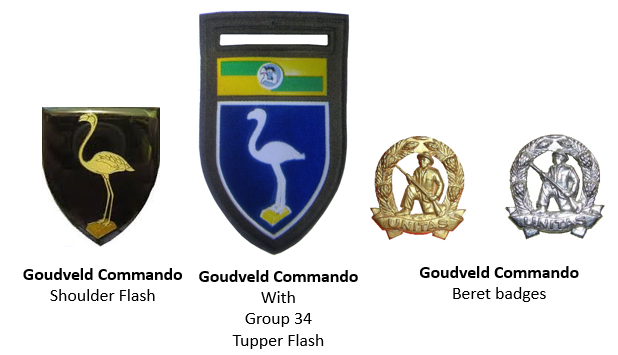
Goudveld Commando insignia

== See also ==
- South African Commando System
