= Wynberg Commando =

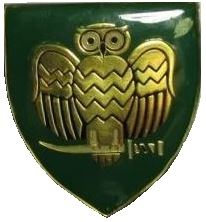
- Wynberg Commando emblem
- Founded: 1962; 64 years ago
- Disbanded: 1997; 29 years ago
- Country: South Africa
- Allegiance: Republic of South Africa; Republic of South Africa
- Branch: South African Army; South African Army
- Type: Infantry
- Role: Light Infantry
- Size: One Battalion
- Part of: South African Infantry Corps; Army Territorial Reserve
- Garrison/HQ: Wynberg
- Motto: Semper vigilans (Always watchful)

Wynberg Commando, later Wynberg Battalion, was a light infantry regiment of the South African Army. It formed part of the South African Infantry Corps.

== History ==
=== Origin ===
This unit was one of several 'urban commandos' which were established in 1962, when the Army's focus was on internal security. It was transferred from the Commandos to the Citizen Force (South African Infantry Corps) in August 1983, and renamed 'Wynberg Battalion'. The battalion was disbanded in 1997.

=== Operations ===
==== With the SADF ====
During this era, the unit was mainly involved in area force protection, cordon and search operations assisting the local police.

==== With the SANDF ====
===== Disbandment =====
This unit was disbanded as part of a scaling-down of the Citizen Force in 1997.

== Unit Insignia ==
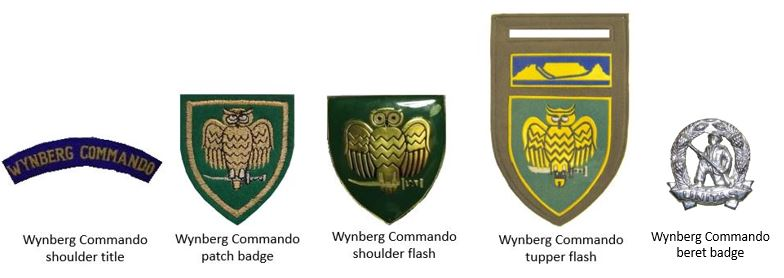
SADF era Wynberg Commando insignia

== Leadership ==
Leadership
From	Honorary Colonels	To	Ribbon
	No known incumbents		
From	Commanding Officers	To	Ribbon
	No known incumbents		
From	Regimental Sergeants Major	To	Ribbon
	No known incumbents		

== See also ==
- South African Commando System
