= Grootfontein Commando =

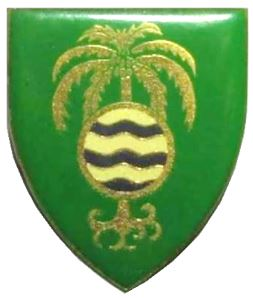
- Grootfontein Commando / Area Force Unit emblem
- Disbanded: December 1988 (37 years ago)
- Country: (South Africa) South West Africa
- Allegiance: Republic of South Africa
- Branch: South African Army
- Type: Infantry
- Role: Light Infantry
- Size: One Battalion
- Part of: South West Africa Territorial Force; Army Territorial Reserve
- Garrison/HQ: Grootfontein South West Africa, now Namibia

Grootfontein Commando was a light infantry regiment of the South West African Territorial Force. It formed part of the Area Force Units as well as the Territorial Reserve.

== History ==
=== Origin ===
Grootfontein Commando was one of 26 Area Force Units, similar to the localised territorial force concept of area bound commandos in South Africa. These units were set in particular sectors of South West Africa mainly from the farming community.

=== Operations ===
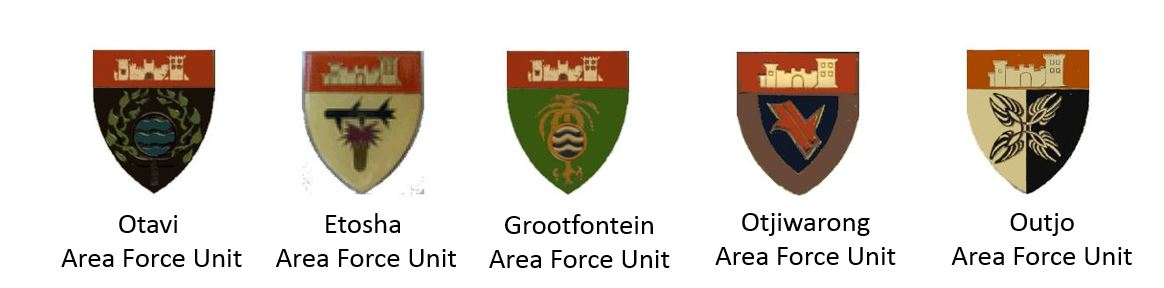
Grootfontein AFU with other SWATF sector 30 Area Force Units

=== Disbandment ===
This unit, along with all other South West Africa Territorial Force units was disbanded with the independence of Namibia from South Africa and was announced around December 1988.

== Leadership ==
Leadership
From	Honorary Colonels	To	Ribbon
	No known incumbents		
From	Commanding Officers	To	Ribbon
	No known incumbents		
From	Regimental Sergeants Major	To	Ribbon
	No known incumbents		

== See also ==
- South African Commando System
