= Barkly West Commando =

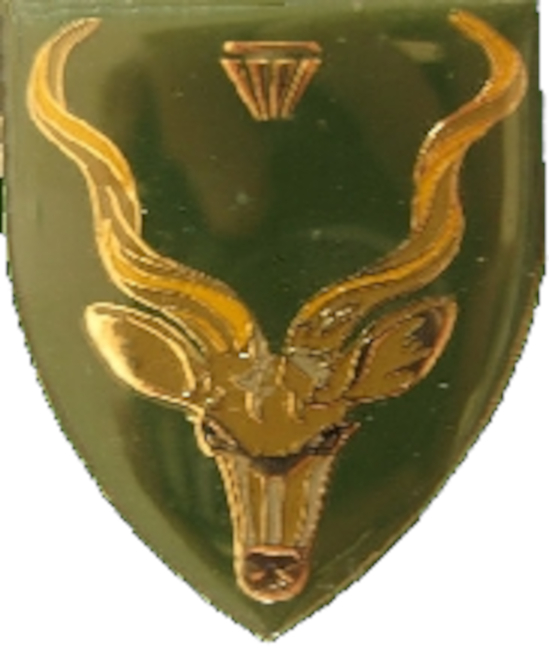
- Barkly West Commando emblem
- Country: South Africa
- Allegiance: Republic of South Africa; Republic of South Africa
- Branch: South African Army; South African Army
- Type: Infantry
- Role: Light Infantry
- Size: One Battalion
- Part of: South African Infantry Corps; Army Territorial Reserve
- Garrison/HQ: Barkly West

Barkly West Commando was a light infantry regiment of the South African Army. It formed part of the South African Army Infantry Formation as well as the South African Territorial Reserve.

== History ==
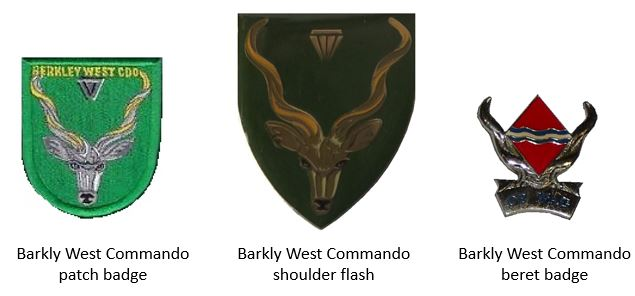
SADF era Barkly West Commando insignia

During the Apartheid era, the unit was mainly engaged in area force protection, search and cordones as well as stock theft control assistance to the rural police.

=== With the SANDF ===
==== Disbandment ====
This unit, along with all other South African Commando System units was disbanded after a decision by South African President Thabo Mbeki to disband all Commando Units. The Commando system was phased out between 2003 and 2008 "because of the role it played in the apartheid era", according to the Minister of Safety and Security Charles Nqakula.
