= Schanskop Commando =

Schanskop Commando/Regiment
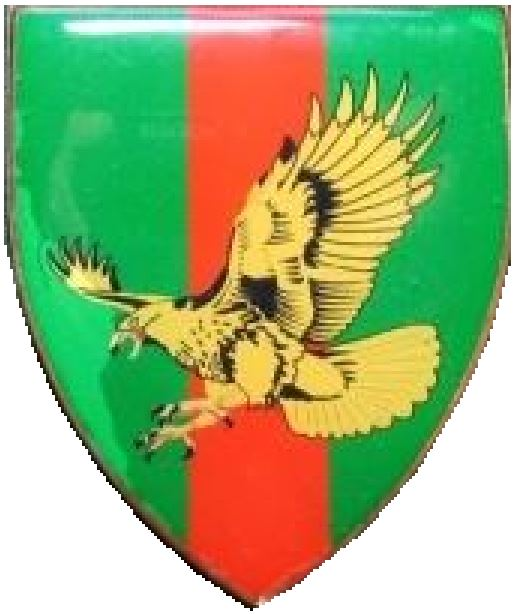
- Schanskop Commando/Regiment
- Country: South Africa
- Allegiance: Republic of South Africa; Republic of South Africa
- Branch: South African Army; South African Army
- Type: Infantry
- Role: Light Infantry
- Size: One Battalion
- Part of: South African Infantry Corps; Army Territorial Reserve
- Garrison/HQ: Schanskop, Pretoria

Schanskop Commando was a light infantry regiment of the South African Army. It formed part of the South African Army Infantry Formation as well as the South African Territorial Reserve.

== History ==
=== Operation ===
==== With the SADF ====
During this era, the unit was mainly used for area force protection, search and cordones as well as stock theft control assistance to the rural police.

==== With the SANDF ====
===== Amalgamation =====
Regiment Tshwane was originally established as the Yskor Pretoria Commando in 1969 and over the years several commando units and regiments, such as Hillcrest, Munitoria, Regiments Pretorius as well as 2 Regiment Noord-Transvaal were amalgamated with Regiment Schanskop.

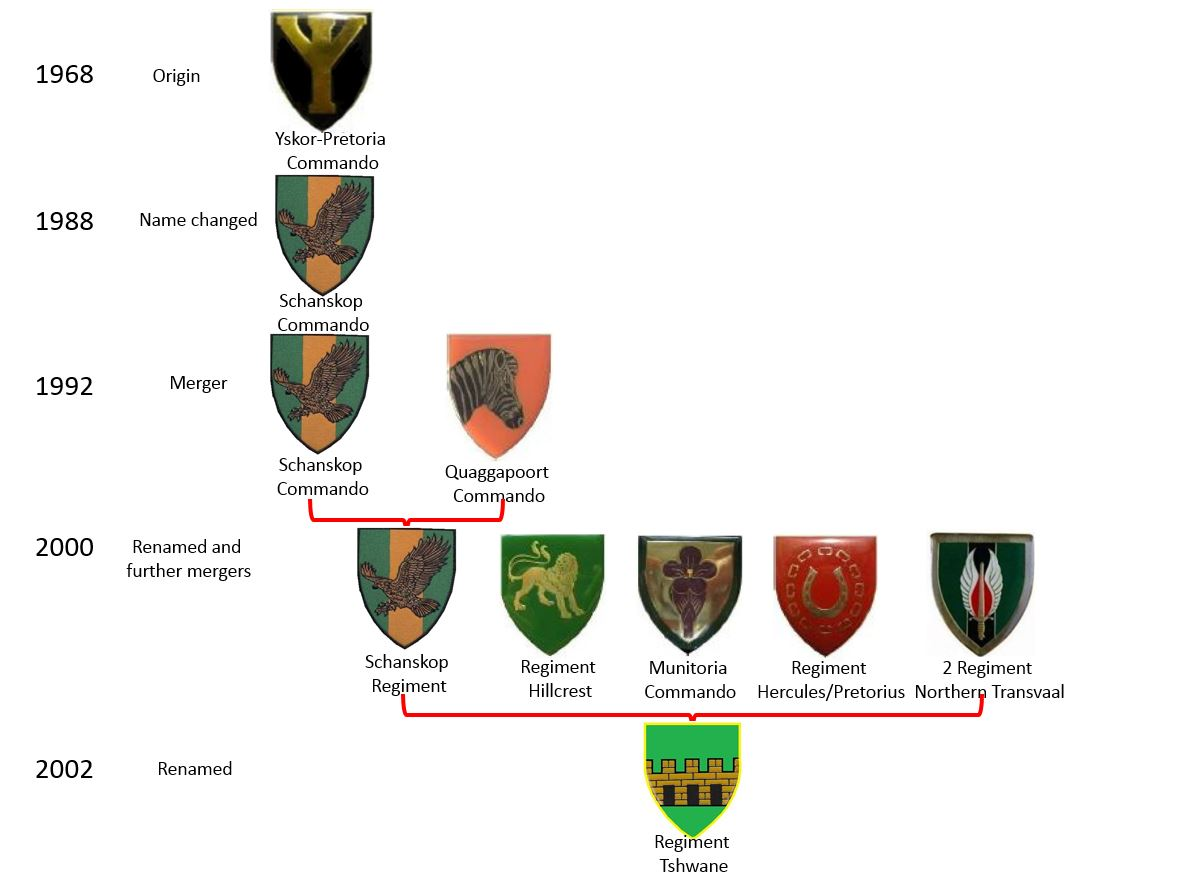
SANDF History of Tshwane Regiment

In December 2002, the name "Tshwane Regiment" was approved to be in line with the area where the Regiment is situated.

== Unit Insignia ==
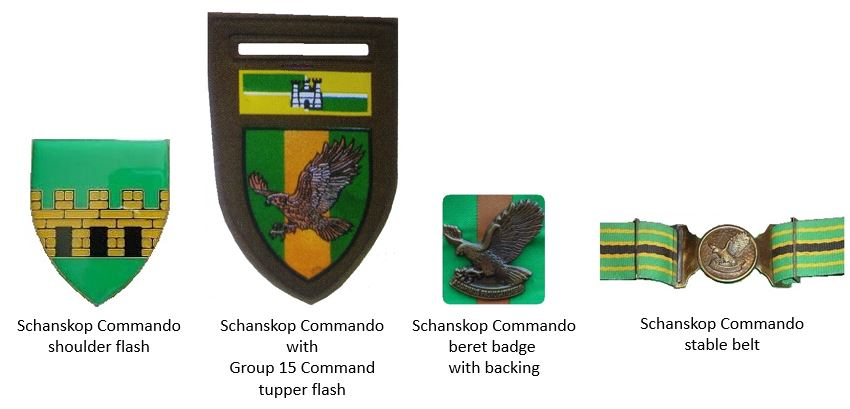
SADF era Schanskop Commando insignia

== Leadership ==
Leadership
From	Honorary Colonels	To	Ribbon
	No known incumbents		
From	Commanding Officers	To	Ribbon
	No known incumbents		
From	Regimental Sergeants Major	To	Ribbon
	No known incumbents		

== See also ==
- South African Commando System
