= Alte Feste Commando =

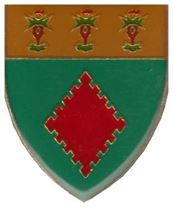
- Alte Feste Commando / Area Force Unit emblem
- Active: – 1989
- Disbanded: 1989
- Country: Republic of South Africa
- Allegiance: Republic of South Africa
- Branch: South African Army
- Type: Infantry
- Role: Light Infantry
- Size: One Battalion
- Part of: South West Africa Territorial Force; Army Territorial Reserve
- Garrison/HQ: Alte Feste, Windhoek, South West Africa now Namibia

Alte Feste Commando was a light infantry regiment of the South West Africa Territorial Force. It formed part of the Area Force Units as well as the Territorial Reserve.

== History ==
=== Origin ===
Alte Feste Commando was one of 26 Area Force Units, similar to the localised territorial force concept of area bound commandos in South Africa. These units were set in particular sectors of South West Africa mainly from the farming community.

=== Operations ===
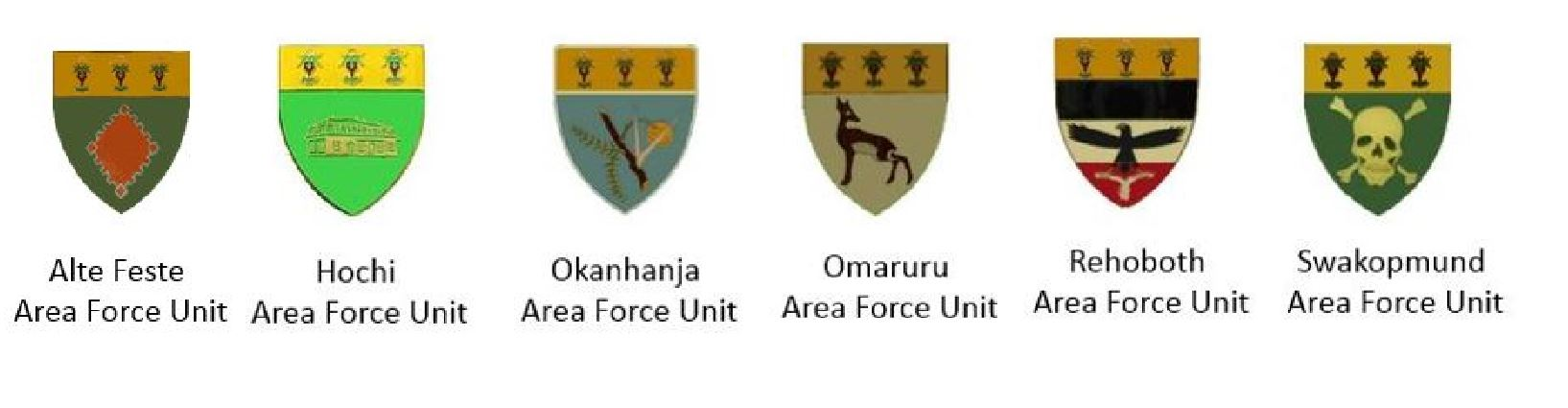
Alte Feste AFU with other SWATF Sector 40 Area Force Units emblems

=== Disbandment ===
This unit, along with all other South West Africa Territorial Force units was disbanded with the independence of Namibia from South Africa and was announced around December 1988.

== Unit insignia ==
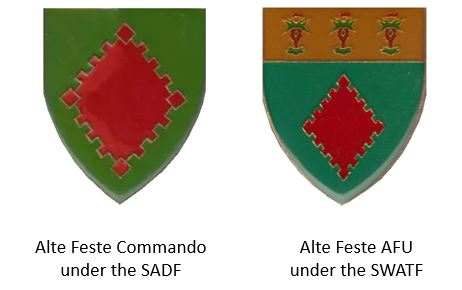
SWATF era Alte Feste Commando Area Force Unit insignia

== Leadership ==
Leadership
From	Honorary Colonels	To	Ribbon
	No known incumbents		
From	Commanding Officer	To	Ribbon
	No known incumbents		
From	Regimental Sergeant Major	To	Ribbon
	No known incumbents		

== See also ==
- South African Commando System
