= Bo-Nossob Commando =

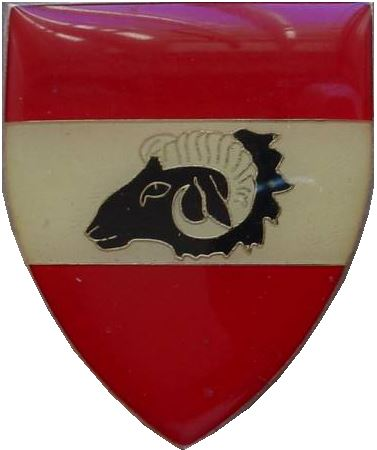
- Bo Nossop Commando / Area Force Unit emblem
- Active: -1989
- Disbanded: 1989
- Country: Republic of South Africa
- Allegiance: Republic of South Africa
- Branch: South African Army
- Type: Infantry
- Role: Light Infantry
- Size: One Battalion
- Part of: South West Africa Territorial Force; Army Territorial Reserve
- Garrison/HQ: Bo-Nossob South West Africa now Namibia

Bo-Nossob Commando was a light infantry regiment of the South West African Territorial Force. It formed part of the Area Force Units as well as the Territorial Reserve.

== History ==
=== Origin ===
Bo Nossob Commando was one of 26 Area Force Units, similar to the localised territorial force concept of area-bound commandos in South Africa. These units were set in particular sectors of South West Africa mainly from the farming community.

=== Operations ===
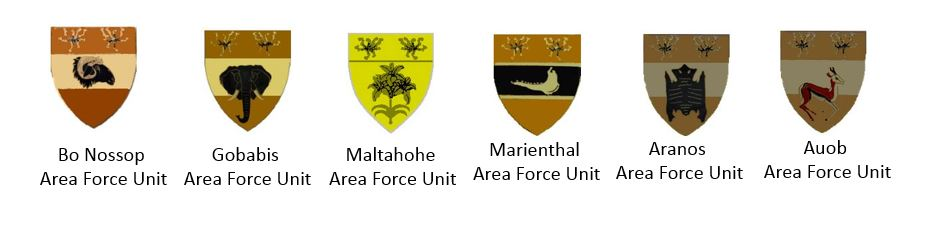
Bo Nossob Commando/AFU with other SWATF Sector 50 Area Force Units

=== Disbandment ===
This unit, along with all other South West Africa Territorial Force units was disbanded with the independence of Namibia from South Africa and was announced around December 1988.

== Leadership ==
Leadership
From	Honorary Colonels	To	Ribbon
	No known incumbents		
From	Commanding Officer	To	Ribbon
	No known incumbents		
From	Regimental Sergeant Major	To	Ribbon
	No known incumbents		

== See also ==
- South African Commando System
