= Hartbeesfontein Commando =

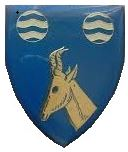
- Hartbeesfontein Commando emblem
- Active: 1954-2006
- Country: South Africa
- Allegiance: Republic of South Africa; Republic of South Africa
- Branch: South African Army; South African Army
- Type: Infantry
- Role: Light Infantry
- Size: One Battalion
- Part of: South African Infantry Corps; Army Territorial Reserve, Group 30
- Garrison/HQ: Hartbeesfontein

Hartbeesfontein Commando was a light infantry regiment of the South African Army. It formed part of the South African Army Infantry Formation as well as the South African Territorial Reserve.

== History ==
=== Operations ===
==== With the SADF ====
The unit resorted under the command of Group 30.

During this era, the unit was mainly used for area force protection, search and cordons as well as stock theft control assistance to the rural police.

==== With the SANDF ====
===== Disbandment =====
This unit, along with all other Commando units was disbanded after a decision by South African President Thabo Mbeki to disband all Commando Units. The Commando system was phased out between 2003 and 2008 "because of the role it played in the apartheid era", according to the Minister of Safety and Security Charles Nqakula.

== Unit Insignia ==
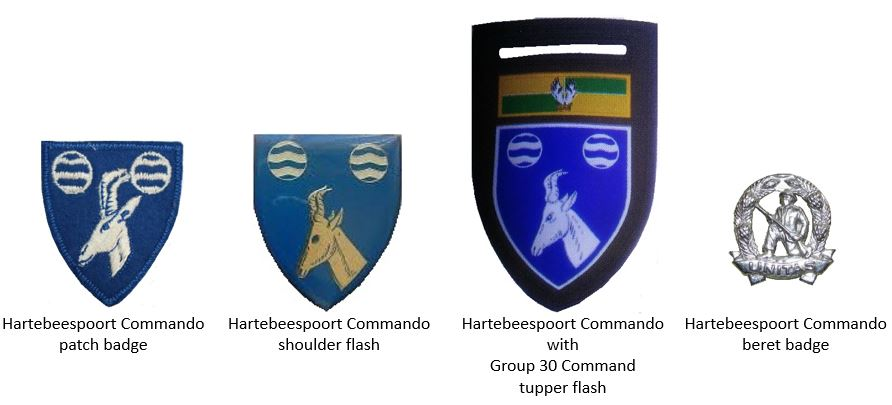
SADF era Hartebeespoort Commando insignia

== Leadership ==
Leadership
From	Honorary Colonels	To	Ribbon
	No known incumbents		
From	Commanding Officers	To	Ribbon
1954	Cmdt G.B. Du Plessis	1964	
1964	Cmdt C.W. De Klerk Swanepoel	1971	
1980	Cmdt J.A. Pretorius	1990	
1990	Lt Col onel F.J.S. De Klerk	1995	
1995	Lt Col onel J.P. Hamman	2002	
2002	Lt Col onel J. Lemmer	2006	
From	Regimental Sergeants Major	To	Ribbon
	No known incumbents		

== See also ==
- South African Commando System
