= Kruger National Park Commando =

South African military unit

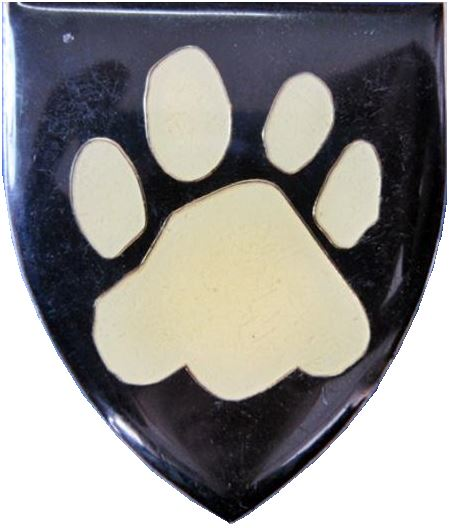
- Kruger National Park Commando
- Country: South Africa
- Allegiance: Republic of South Africa; Republic of South Africa
- Branch: South African Army; South African Army
- Type: Infantry
- Role: Light Infantry
- Size: One Battalion
- Part of: South African Infantry Corps; Army Territorial Reserve
- Garrison/HQ: Kruger National Park

Kruger National Park Commando was a light infantry regiment of the South African Army. It formed part of the South African Army Infantry Formation as well as the South African Territorial Reserve.

== History ==
=== Operations ===
==== With the SADF ====
Kruger National Park Commando (KNPC) was based in the Kruger National Park and had 4 small base camps situated at:

- Crocodile Bridge,
- Sandriver near Skukuza,
- Shishangane near Nwanetsi and
- Masakosapan near Shingwedzi.

Each base was more or less of platoon strength with Sandriver as the headquarters.

The main role of the KNPC was daily foot patrols from south to north interdicting refugees and smugglers from Mozambique.

==== With the SANDF ====
===== Disbandment =====
This unit, along with all other Commando units was disbanded after a decision by South African President Thabo Mbeki to disband all Commando Units. The Commando system was phased out between 2003 and 2008 "because of the role it played in the apartheid era", according to the Minister of Safety and Security Charles Nqakula.

===== Operation Corona =====
The role the KNPC fulfilled was eventually reactivated in the SANDF by Operation Corona.

== Unit insignia ==
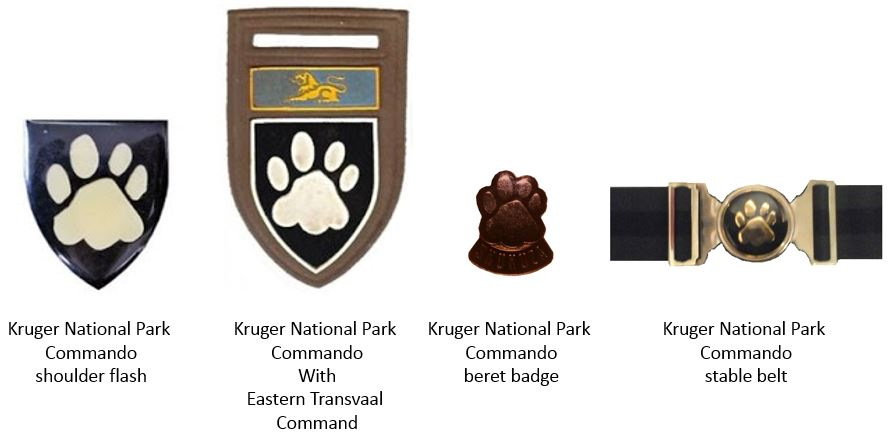
SADF era Kruger National Park Commando insignia

== See also ==
- South African Commando System
