= South West Karoo Commando =

- Disbanded: February 14, 2003 (23 years ago)
- Country: South Africa
- Allegiance: Republic of South Africa; Republic of South Africa
- Branch: South African Army; South African Army
- Type: Infantry
- Role: Light Infantry
- Size: One Battalion
- Part of: South African Infantry Corps; Army Territorial Reserve
- Garrison/HQ: South West Karoo

South West Karoo Commando was a light infantry regiment of the South African Army. It formed part of the South African Army Infantry Formation as well as the South African Territorial Reserve.

== History ==
=== Disbandment ===
This unit, along with all other Commando units was disbanded after a decision by South African President Thabo Mbeki to disband all Commando Units. The Commando system was phased out between 2003 and 2008 "because of the role it played in the apartheid era", according to the Minister of Safety and Security Charles Nqakula.

== Leadership ==
Leadership
From	Honorary Colonels	To	Ribbon
	No known incumbents		
From	Commanding Officers	To	Ribbon
	No known incumbents		
From	Regimental Sergeants Major	To	Ribbon
	No known incumbents		

== See also ==
- South African Commando System
