= Kimberley Commando =

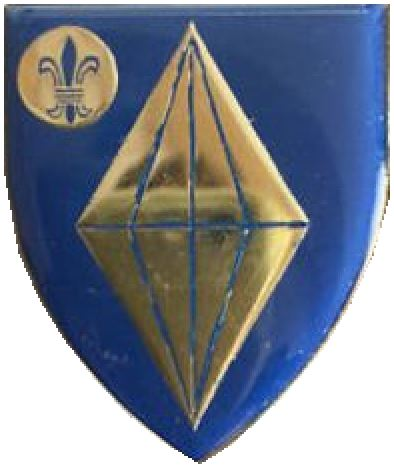
- Kimberly Commando insignia
- Active: 1964-2003
- Country: South Africa
- Allegiance: Cape Colony; Union of South Africa; Republic of South Africa; Republic of South Africa
- Branch: South African Army; South African Army
- Type: Infantry
- Role: Light Infantry
- Size: One Battalion
- Part of: South African Infantry Corps; Army Territorial Reserve
- Garrison/HQ: Kimberley

Kimberley Commando was a light infantry regiment of the South African Army. It formed part of the South African Army Infantry Formation as well as the South African Territorial Reserve.

== History ==
=== Origin ===
The origin of this unit is the Kimberley Town Guard which raised in October 1899 to defend the city from Boer Republican attack. By November 1899, the strength of the Town Guard, had been increased to 130 officers and 2,520 non-commissioned officers and men. During the siege of Kimberly, the Town Guard, held trenches and defensive works.

=== Operations ===
==== With the UDF ====
The Kimberly Commando was originally established in Kimberly in 1936 as the West End Rifle Association. Members had to provide their own weapons and ammunition. By 1938, the Defence Rifle Association was created and weapons could then be bought directly from the Department of Defence.

==== With the SADF ====
As with other Rifle Associations, this unit was renamed in 1964.

Its headquarters was based in the private homes of its commanding officers.

In 1964, 1970, 1974 and 1980 the HQ was moved around until it finally shared space with Group 22 HQ at Scanlan Street. The units main function in this era was search and cordon assistance in the urban area of Kimberly in assistance to the Police.

===== Border War =====
From 1976, the unit provided troops for service in the operational area.

==== With the SANDF ====
===== Disbandment =====
This unit, along with all other Commando units was disbanded after a decision by South African President Thabo Mbeki to disband all Commando Units. The Commando system was phased out between 2003 and 2008 "because of the role it played in the apartheid era", according to the Minister of Safety and Security Charles Nqakula.

== Leadership ==
Leadership
From	Honorary Colonels	To	Ribbon
	No known incumbents		
From	Commanding Officers	To	Ribbon
1936	Lt Col J.C. O'Ehley	nd	
1942	Maj S.J. Scott	nd	
1964	Lt Col De Jager	nd	
nd	Cmdt H.L. Herholdt	nd	
1970	Cmdt P.G. Slabbert	nd	
1974	Cmdt M.K. Brits	nd	
1976	Cmdt F. Schreck	nd	
From	Regimental Sergeants Major	To	Ribbon
	No known incumbents		

== Unit insignia ==
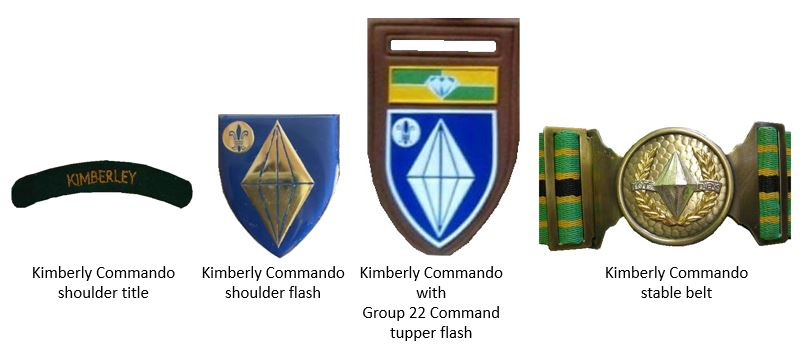
SADF era Kimberly Commando insignia ver 2

== See also ==
- South African Commando System
