= Walvis Bay Commando =

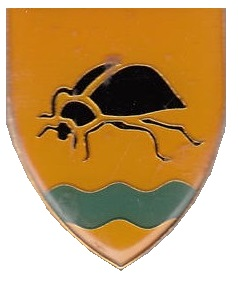
- Disbanded: 1994 (32 years ago)
- Country: South Africa
- Allegiance: Republic of South Africa
- Branch: South African Army
- Type: Infantry
- Role: Light Infantry
- Size: One Battalion
- Part of: South African Infantry Corps; Army Territorial Reserve
- Garrison/HQ: Walvis Bay

Walvis Bay Commando was a light infantry regiment of the South African Army. It formed part of the South African Army Infantry Formation as well as the South African Territorial Reserve.

== History ==
=== Operations ===
==== With the SADF ====
During this era, the unit was mainly involved in area force protection, cordones and search operations assisting the local police and stock theft control.

===== Disbandment =====
This unit with any remaining South African units left in Namibia by 1994 was disbanded after the enclave of Walvis Bay was handed over to the new Namibian government. This followed bilateral discussions and a transitional Joint Administrative Authority to administer the territory.

== Unit Insignia ==
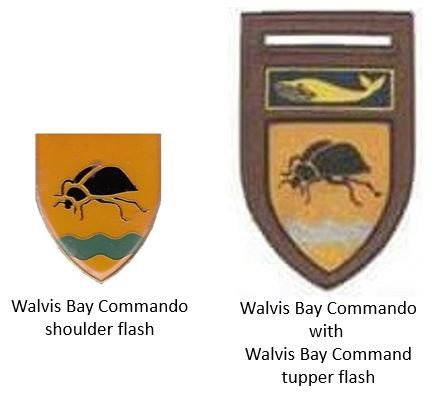
SADF era Walvis Bay Commando insignia

== Leadership ==
Leadership
From	Honorary Colonels	To	Ribbon
	No known incumbents		
From	Commanding Officers	To	Ribbon
	No known incumbents		
From	Regimental Sergeants Major	To	Ribbon
	No known incumbents		

== See also ==
- South African Commando System
