= Witwatersrand Command =

Command of the South African Army

- The Drill Hall, Johannesburg, South Africa
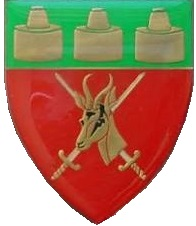

Site information
- Type: Command (military formation)

The Witwatersrand Command was a Command of the South African Army. It was one of the ten regional commands, which, with the Walvis Bay Military Area, made up the Territorial Force.

== History ==
=== Origin ===
Based in Johannesburg, it was responsible for the security of the region, forming the primary level of command for military operations in support of the Police. It also provided logistic, administrative and service support to units and formations operating in its area of responsibility.

When 6th Light Anti-Aircraft Regiment SAA became operational in 1966 with its headquarters at Brakpan, it was originally administratively responsible to Headquarters Witwatersrand Command, but was later transferred to I South African Corps.

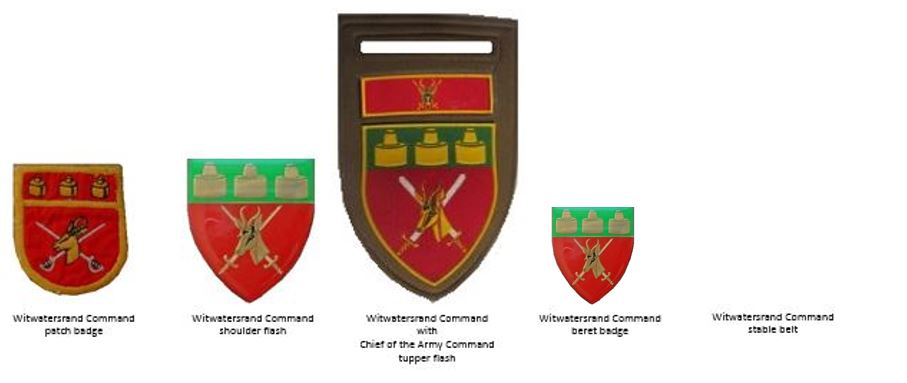
SADF era Witwatersrand Command insignia

In 1987, the command headquarters installation was the target of a bomb by Umkhonto we Sizwe operative Hein Grosskopf.

== Groups and Commando Units ==
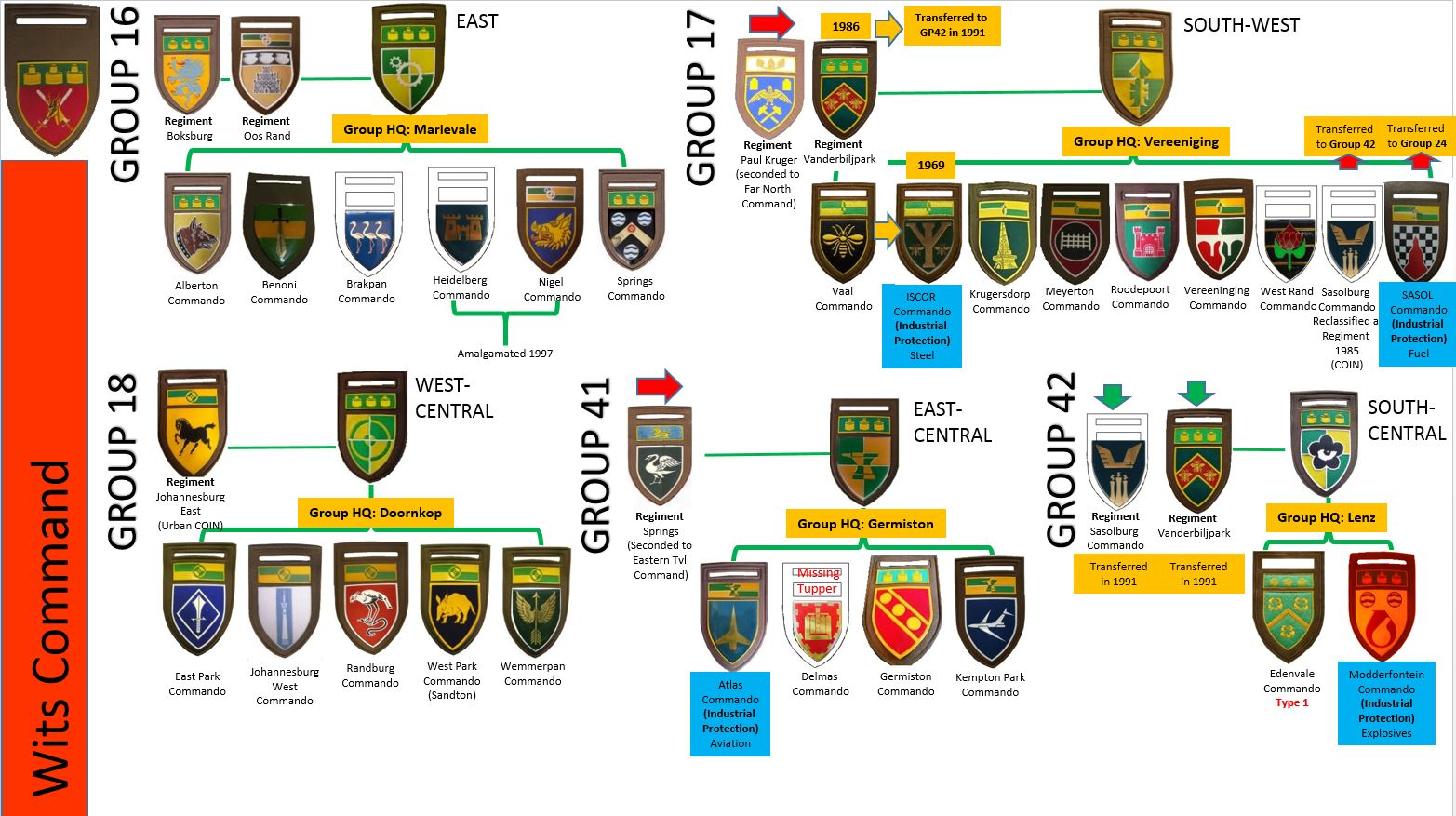
SADF era Wits Command Commando Structure

=== Group 16 (Marievale) ===
- Delmas Commando
- Nigel Commando
- Springs Commando

=== Group 17 (Midvaal) ===
- Iscor Commando
- Krugersdorp Commando
- Meyerton Commando
- Vaal Commando
- Vanderbijl Park Commando
- Vereeniging Commando

=== Group 18 (Doornkop) ===
- East Park Commando
- Gatsrand Commando
- Johannesburg East Commando
- Johannesburg West Commando
- Randburg Commando
- Roodepoort Commando
- Wemmerpan Commando
- West Rand Commando

=== Group 41 (Primrose) ===
- Atlas Commando
- Benoni Commando
- Brakpan Commando
- Boksburg Commando
- Germiston Commando
- Kempton Park Commando

=== Group 42 (Lenz) ===
- Alberton Commando
- Edenvale Commando
- Modderfontein Commando
- Sandton Commando

== Leadership ==
Leadership of Wits Command
From	Commanding Officers	To	Ribbon
1936	Maj -General Christoffel Venter CB	1936	Order of the Bath CB
c. 1939	Lt Col Charlie Ross	n.d.	
c. 1945	Maj Gen Bertram Frank Armstrong	n.d.	
August 1940	Lt Col William E.C. Tanner (Note: Later Major General William Tanner CMG))	October 1940	
1974	Brig G.W. Germishuizen	n.d.	
1987	Brig Joffel van der Westhuizen	n.d.	
From	Command Sgts Major	To	Ribbon
	No known incumbents		
