= Klein Karoo Commando =

Light infantry regiment of the South African Army

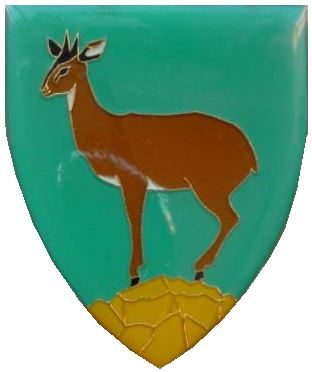
- Klein Karoo Commando emblem
- Active: 1976 (50 years ago)–1997 (29 years ago)
- Disbanded: February 14, 2003 (23 years ago)
- Country: South Africa
- Allegiance: Republic of South Africa; Republic of South Africa
- Branch: South African Army; South African Army
- Type: Infantry
- Role: Light Infantry
- Size: One Battalion
- Part of: South African Infantry Corps; Army Territorial Reserve
- Garrison/HQ: Uniondale, Western Cape Willowmore

Klein Karoo Commando was a light infantry regiment of the South African Army. It formed part of the South African Army Infantry Formation as well as the South African Territorial Reserve.

== History ==
=== Origin ===
==== With the SADF ====
Uniondale Commando amalgamated with Willowmore Commando around 1976 to form Klein Karoo Commando.

==== With the SANDF ====
===== Further amalgamation =====
In 1997, the unit amalgamated with Oudtshoorn Commando keeping the name Klein Karoo. Towns under this command now included Joubertina, Uniondale, Willowmore and Steylerville.

===== Operations =====
This unit was primarily used for area force protection and stock theft control assistance to the local police.

===== Disbandment =====
This unit, along with all other Commando units was disbanded after a decision by South African President Thabo Mbeki to disband all Commando Units. The Commando system was phased out between 2003 and 2008 "because of the role it played in the apartheid era", according to the Minister of Safety and Security Charles Nqakula.

== Unit Insignia ==
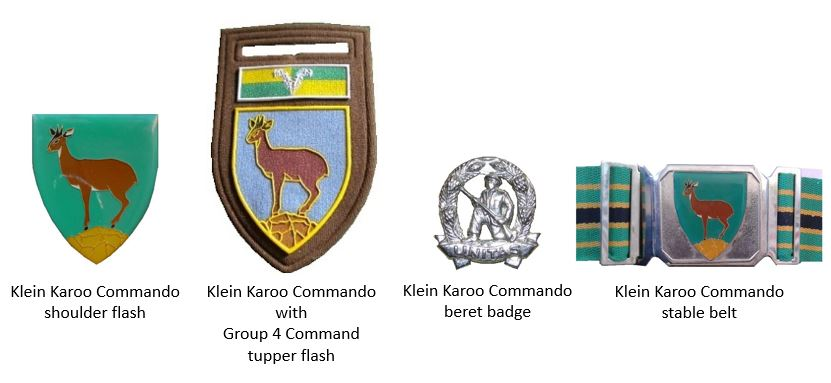
SADF era Klein Karoo Commando insignia

== Leadership ==
Leadership
From	Honorary Colonels	To	Ribbon
	No known incumbents		
From	Commanding Officer	To	Ribbon
	No known incumbents		
From	Regimental Sergeant Major	To	Ribbon
	No known incumbents		

== See also ==
- South African Commando System
