= Ismail Cachalia =

Ismail Cachalia may refer to:

- Ismail Ahmed "Moulvi" Cachalia (1908–2003), South African political activist
- Ismail Mahomed Cachalia, South African politician and legislator

== See also ==
- Cachalia
