= Kuruman Commando =

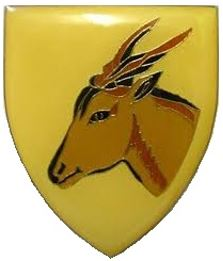
- Kuruman Commando emblem
- Country: South Africa
- Allegiance: Republic of South Africa; Republic of South Africa
- Branch: South African Army; South African Army
- Type: Infantry
- Role: Light Infantry
- Size: One Battalion
- Part of: South African Infantry Corps; Army Territorial Reserve
- Garrison/HQ: Kuruman

Kuruman Commando was a light infantry regiment of the South African Army. It formed part of the South African Army Infantry Formation as well as the South African Territorial Reserve.

== History ==
=== Operations ===
==== With the SADF ====
During this era, the unit was mainly engaged in area force protection, search and cordones as well as stock theft control assistance to the rural police.

==== With the SANDF ====
===== Amalgamation with Sishen Commando =====
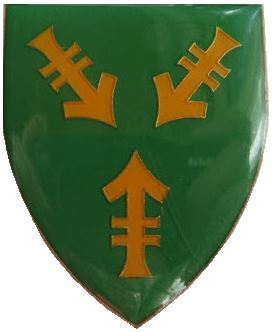
In the late 1990s Kuruman and Sishen Commando merge and a new emblem was developed:

===== Disbandment =====
The amalgamated unit, along with all other Commando units was disbanded after a decision by South African President Thabo Mbeki to disband all Commando Units. The Commando system was phased out between 2003 and 2008 "because of the role it played in the apartheid era", according to the Minister of Safety and Security Charles Nqakula.

== Unit insignia ==
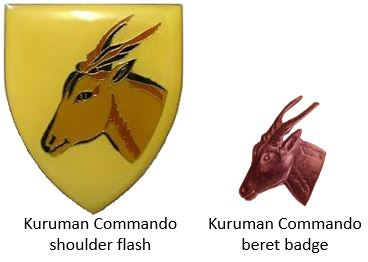
SADF era Kuruman Commando insignia

== See also ==
- South African Commando System
