= Calvinia Commando =

Light infantry regiment of the South African Army

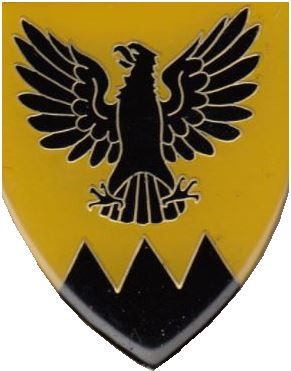
- Calvinia Commando
- Active: 1898-2006
- Country: South Africa
- Allegiance: Cape Colony; Union of South Africa; Republic of South Africa; Republic of South Africa
- Branch: South African Army; South African Army
- Type: Infantry
- Role: Light Infantry
- Size: One Battalion
- Part of: South African Infantry Corps; Army Territorial Reserve
- Garrison/HQ: Calvinia

Calvinia Commando was a light infantry regiment of the South African Army. It formed part of the South African Army Infantry Formation as well as the South African Territorial Reserve.

== History ==
=== Origin ===
Calvinia Commando was one of the original Cape Colony Commandos dating from before the Anglo-Boer War.

=== Operations ===
==== With the UDF ====
As one of the Cape Commandos, this unit was not called up due to the Maritz Rebellion, but did serve against the Germans in German South West Africa from October 1914 until May 1915.

In February 1915, the Calvinia-Kenhardt Commando was formed out of the following:

- Kenhardt Commando
- Louw's Commando
- Pretorius' Calvinia Commando
- Vermaas Scouts

==== With the SADF ====
During this era, the unit was mainly used for area force protection, search and cordones as well as stock theft control assistance to the rural police.

==== With the SANDF ====
===== Disbandment =====
This unit, along with all other Commando units was disbanded after a decision by South African President Thabo Mbeki to disband all Commando Units. The Commando system was phased out between 2003 and 2008 "because of the role it played in the apartheid era", according to the Minister of Safety and Security Charles Nqakula.

== Unit Insignia ==
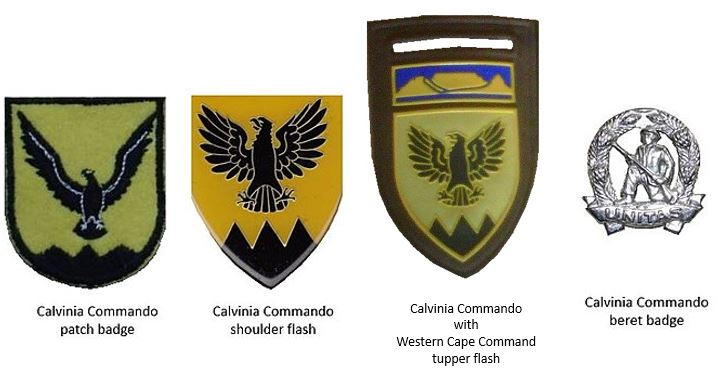
SADF era Calvinia Commando insignia

== Leadership ==
Leadership
From	Honorary Colonels	To	Ribbon
	No known incumbents		
From	Commanding Officer	To	Ribbon
	No known incumbents		
From	Regimental Sergeant Major	To	Ribbon
	No known incumbents		

== See also ==
- South African Commando System
