= Knysna Commando =

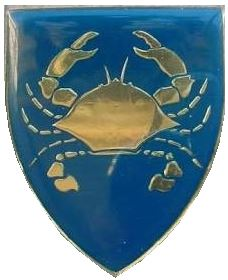
- Knysna Commando emblem
- Founded: 1934; 92 years ago
- Disbanded: February 14, 2003; 23 years ago
- Country: South Africa
- Allegiance: Republic of South Africa; Republic of South Africa
- Branch: South African Army; South African Army
- Type: Infantry
- Role: Light Infantry
- Size: One Battalion
- Part of: South African Infantry Corps; Army Territorial Reserve, Group 4
- Garrison/HQ: Knysna

Knysna Commando was a light infantry regiment of the South African Army. It formed part of the South African Army Infantry Formation as well as the South African Territorial Reserve.

== History ==
=== Origin ===
Founded at Knysna around 1934. Members were issued originally with .303 rifles and used for area force protection such as search and cordons as well as stock theft control and police assistance.

=== Operations ===
==== With the SADF ====
During 1978 a rifle range was built on ground ceded by the Department of Forestry.

This unit resorted under the command of Group 4 at Oudtshoorn with Southern Cape Command up to 1986. The Group was subsequently transferred to Western Cape Command. The unit received its national colours at the Castle of Good Hope 14 September 1993.

==== With the SANDF ====
===== Amalgamation =====
Outeniqua Commando was amalgamated with Knysna Commando and was renamed Garden Route Commando by June 1997.

===== Disbandment =====
This unit, along with all other Commando units, was disbanded following an announcement by South African President Thabo Mbeki in his State of the Nation Address on 14 February 2003, in which he declared that the government would phase out SANDF commandos and replace them with "a new system whose composition and ethos accord with the requirements of all rural communities." The Commando system was phased out between 2003 and 2008 "because of the role it played in the apartheid era", according to the Minister of Safety and Security Charles Nqakula.

On 21 April 2003, this Commando laid up its colours at the Albatross Shellhole in Knysna for safekeeping.

== Unit Insignia ==
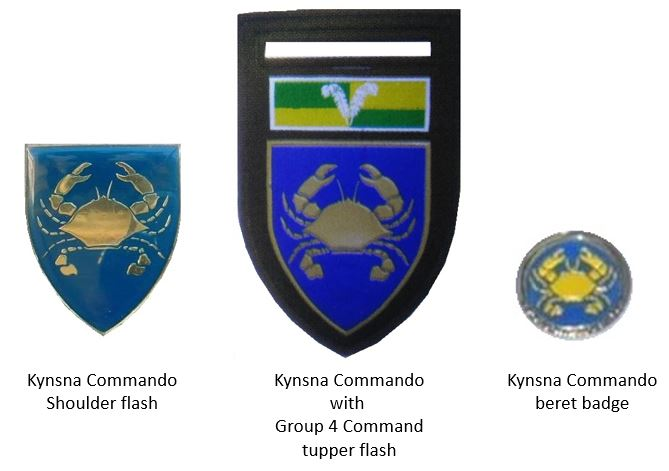
SADF era Kynsna Commano insignia ver 2

== See also ==
- South African Commando System
