= Brakpan Commando =

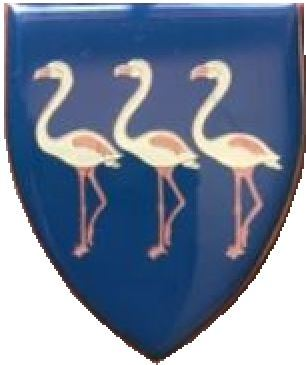
- Brakpan Commando emblem
- Founded: 1922 (104 years ago)
- Disbanded: February 14, 2003 (23 years ago)
- Country: South Africa
- Allegiance: Republic of South Africa; Republic of South Africa
- Branch: South African Army; South African Army
- Type: Infantry
- Role: Light Infantry
- Size: One Battalion
- Part of: South African Infantry Corps; Army Territorial Reserve
- Garrison/HQ: Brakpan, Gauteng

Brakpan Commando was a light infantry regiment of the South African Army. It formed part of the South African Army Infantry Formation as well as the South African Territorial Reserve.

== History ==
=== Origin ===
This unit was established in 1922 during the Rand Revolt as a rebel commando under "General" R.B. Waterston to help the striking miners.

=== Operations ===
==== Rebel Commando ====
During the revolt, this commando massacred 8 opposing mine officials and special constables. The leader at that time, John Garsworthy was sentenced to death but this was later commuted.

==== With the UDF ====
The commando that had started as a communist rebel movement was eventually incorporated as a normal commando of the Union Defence Force.

==== With the SADF ====
During the SADF period, this unit resorted under Group 16 in Marievale.

During this era, the unit was mainly engaged in area force protection, search and cordons as well as other assistance to the local police.

As an urban unit, this commando was also tasked with protecting strategic facilities as well as quelling township riots especially during the State of Emergency in the 1980s.

==== With the SANDF ====
===== Disbandment =====
This unit, along with all other Commando units was disbanded after a decision by South African President Thabo Mbeki to disband all Commando Units. The Commando system was phased out between 2003 and 2008 "because of the role it played in the apartheid era", according to the Minister of Safety and Security Charles Nqakula.

== Unit Insignia ==
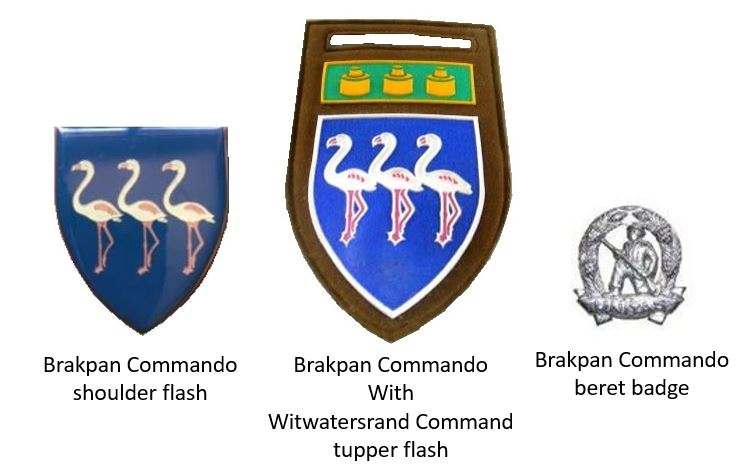
SADF era Brakpan Commando insignia

== Leadership ==
Leadership
From	Honorary Colonels	To	Ribbon
	No known incumbents		
From	Commanding Officer	To	Ribbon
1982	Lt Col A. W. Nel	2002	
2002	Lt Col R.N. Steele	2005	
From	Regimental Sergeant Major	To	Ribbon
2002	WO1 L. Brooke MMM,JCD	nd	Military Merit Medal MMM John Chard Decoration JCD
2002	WO1 A.B. Boone MMM,JCD	2004	Military Merit Medal MMM John Chard Decoration JCD

== See also ==
- South African Commando System
