= Atlas Commando =

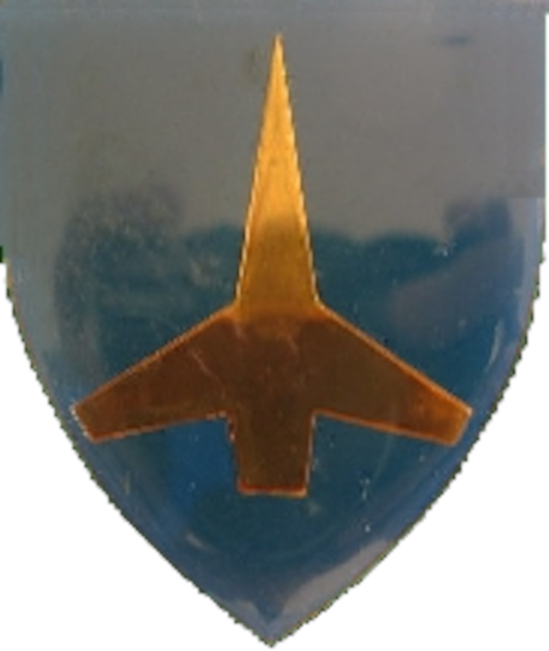
- Atlas Commando emblem
- Disbanded: February 14, 2003 (23 years ago)
- Country: South Africa
- Allegiance: Republic of South Africa; Republic of South Africa
- Branch: South African Army; South African Army
- Type: Infantry
- Role: Light Infantry
- Size: One Battalion
- Part of: South African Infantry Corps; Army Territorial Reserve
- Garrison/HQ: Kempton Park

Atlas Commando was a light infantry regiment of the South African Army. It formed part of the South African Army Infantry Formation as well as the South African Territorial Reserve.

== History ==
=== Origin ===
==== Industrial Commando ====
The Atlas Commando was formed to assign males of military service age to meet their commitments at the Atlas Aircraft Corporation, a facility considered important to their Air Force's equipment requirements.

=== Operations ===
==== With the SADF ====
During this era, the unit was mainly engaged in area force protection, search and cordons as well as other assistance to the local police.

As an urban unit, this commando was also tasked with protecting strategic facilities as well as quelling township riots especially during the State of Emergency in the 1980s.

==== With the SANDF ====
===== Disbandment =====
This unit, along with all other Commando units was disbanded after a decision by South African President Thabo Mbeki to disband all Commando Units. The Commando system was phased out between 2003 and 2008 "because of the role it played in the apartheid era", according to the Minister of Safety and Security Charles Nqakula.

== Insignia ==
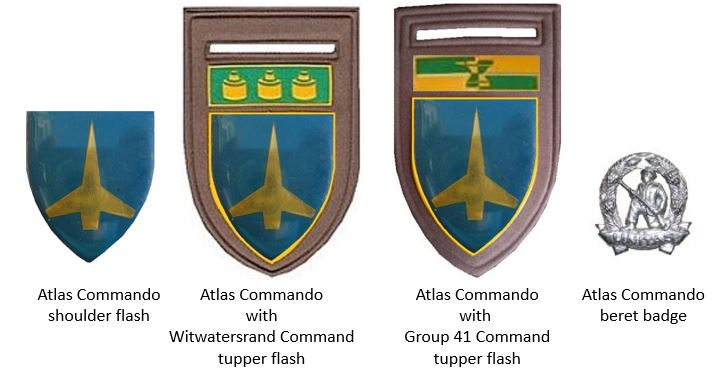
SADF era Atlas Commando insignia

== Leadership ==
Leadership
| From | Honorary Colonels | To | Ribbon |
|---|---|---|---|
| | No known incumbents | | |
| From | Commanding Officer | To | Ribbon |
| | No known incumbents | | |
| From | Regimental Sergeant Major | To | Ribbon |
| | No known incumbents | | |

== See also ==
- South African Commando System
