= Edenvale Commando =

Edenvale Commando / Regiment
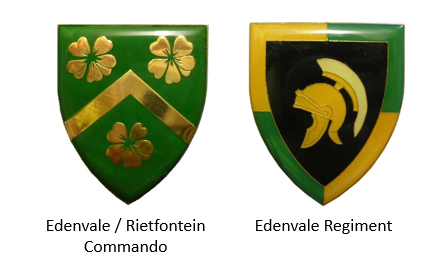
- SADF Edenvale Commando and Regiment emblems
- Disbanded: February 14, 2003 (23 years ago)
- Country: South Africa
- Allegiance: Republic of South Africa; Republic of South Africa
- Branch: South African Army; South African Army
- Type: Infantry
- Role: Light Infantry
- Size: One Battalion
- Part of: South African Infantry Corps; Army Territorial Reserve
- Garrison/HQ: Edenvale, Gauteng

Edenvale Commando was a light infantry regiment of the South African Army. It formed part of the South African Army Infantry Formation as well as the South African Territorial Reserve.

== History ==
=== Operations ===
==== With the SADF ====
During this era, the unit was mainly engaged in area force protection, search and cordons as well as other assistance to the local police.

The unit resorted under the command of Group 41.

==== With the SANDF ====
===== Disbandment =====
This unit, along with all other Commando units was disbanded after a decision by South African President Thabo Mbeki to disband all Commando Units. The Commando system was phased out between 2003 and 2008 "because of the role it played in the apartheid era", according to the Minister of Safety and Security Charles Nqakula.

By 2013, the derelict Rietfontein Commando base had fallen into a state of decay, raising many concerns by local residents and business owners. Also known as the Edenvale Commando/Barracks, the building, together with the current Sebenza Police Station, used to house a wing of the South African Defence Force. A report requested the municipality for permission to demolish the building and sell the land by public tender.

== Leadership ==
Leadership
From	Honorary Colonels	To	Ribbon
	No known incumbents		
From	Commanding Officers	To	Ribbon
	No known incumbents		
From	Regimental Sergeants Major	To	Ribbon
	No known incumbents		

== Insignia ==
=== Dress Insignia ===
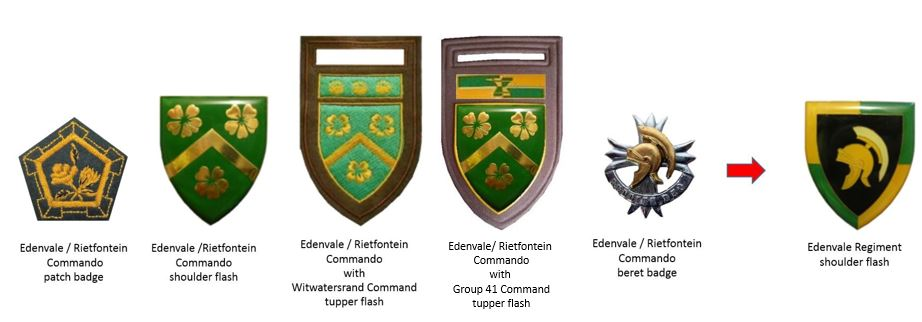
SADF era Edenvale Commando / Regiment insignia

== See also ==
- South African Commando System
