= 15 Reception Depot =

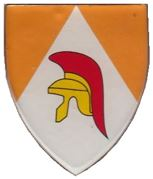
- 15 Reception Depot emblem
- Active: 1939–2002
- Country: South Africa
- Allegiance: Republic of South Africa; Republic of South Africa
- Branch: South African Army; South African Army
- Type: Mobilisation Depot
- Part of: South African Personnel Service Corps
- Garrison/HQ: Wanderers
- Motto(s): Perepi

15 Reception Depot was an administrative unit of the Personnel Service Corps of the South African Army.

== History ==
=== Origin ===
15 Reception Depot (15 RCD) was activated on 10 September 1939 to muster South African volunteers signing up to take part in World War 2, it operated as the reception depot to service the then Witwatersrand Command. The depot drew its recruits mainly from Johannesburg and the immediate surrounds.

=== UDF era and World War II ===
The depot operated from the Milner Park Showgrounds and the Wanderers Grounds in Johannesburg. The unit was also responsible for the routing and demobilisation of returning South African Union Defence Force (UDF) soldiers until it was disbanded after the Second World War on 31 December 1945..

=== SADF era and the Bush War ===
The unit was reactivated on 29 April 1964 owing to the threat of a United Nations action in respect of South West Africa, and in case such a situation required the mobilisation of South African Army Citizen Force units. When the threat subsided, the unit was retained to process the bi-annual national service intake of white South African conscripts drawn from the greater Witwatersrand area. The government policy of compulsory conscription preceding 1994 was exclusively for young ‘white’ South African men. Men of ‘black’ South African heritage at the time were recruited into the South African Army on a voluntary basis and joined ethnically differentiated Battalions directly as 'Permanent Force' members.

15 Reception Depot was one of a number of Reception Depots around South Africa which was tasked to the intake of national service conscripts into the South African Defence Force (SADF). Each Regional Command in the SADF structure had its own Reception Depot. Due to the population size of the Witwatersrand region and resultant intake size, 15 RCD spearheaded the drafting process.

The reception depot units fell under the Personnel Services Corps (PSC) of the SADF. To mobilise these 'white' South African conscripted troops, duties and tasks performed by 15 RCD involved:

- the registering of young white males at high schools
- the issuing of call-up papers
- confirmation of the recruits arrival
- logistics surrounding mustering locations
- public relations and media relations
- intelligence gathering as to anti-conscription protests and threats
- the transport of these recruits to various allotted training units
- security operations surrounding the mustering stations and convoys of recruits in transit to their respective training bases

15 Reception Depot HQ was stationed at the Witwatersrand Command's Drill Hall in downtown Johannesburg until the Drill Hall was bombed on 30 July 1987 by a lone Umkhonto we Sizwe insurgent, Hein Grosskopf. The explosion injured 26 people (a mix of both military personnel and by-standing civilians) with no deaths, the building was however deemed unsafe and 15 Reception Depot's HQ moved into a high rise building adjacent to the Drill Hall.

15 Reception Depot initially conducted the bi-annual intake of national servicemen from Sturrock Park railway station in Johannesburg and escorted these recruits to their respective army training units by train, this intake of conscripts was later moved to the Nasrec Expo centre show grounds and the majority of national servicemen recruits were convoyed to their training units in busses.

During early 1994, 15 Reception Depot became involved in the mustering of members of the SADF's reserve. SADF Army numbers needed boosting by trained SADF conscripts ahead of South Africa's first fully democratic election. During these General Elections which were held between 26 and 29 April 1994, these SADF Reservists were called to maintain national security at the election stations themselves and the secure transfer of ballot boxes for counting.

=== SANDF era ===
From April 1994, the unit was initially involved in the integration of non-statutory forces members into the newly reformatted South African National Defence Force (SANDF). The first multiracial intakes also occurred in 1994 through the Voluntary Military Service (VMS) System. Mustering at this time of VMS recruits was coordinated by 15 RCD at the Nasrec show grounds. After 1994 Witwatersrand Command was re-designated as Gauteng Command, and the Command along with 15 Reception Depot HQ was moved to Group 18 located at Doornkop military base.

By the early 2000s, Commands were no longer responsible for individual recruitment, making Reception Depots essentially redundant.

== Leadership ==
15 RCD Commanding Officers

Capt J.W. Hammond; 10 Sep 39 - 31 Dec 45

Maj H. van der Merwe; 29 Apr 64 - 31 Dec 69

Maj W.F.J. Smith; 10 Jan 70 - 30 May 72

Maj R.P. van Belkum; 01 Jun 72 - 31 Jan 73

Cmdt C.A. Twomey; 01 Feb 73 - 28 Feb 74

Cmdt H.L. Kühn; 06 Mar 74 - 31 Dec 77

Cmdt C.A. Roos; 01 Jan 78 - 30 Jun 79

Cmdt P.J. Joubert; 01 Jul 79 - 31 May 87

Cmdt P.J.M. Van Niekerk; 01 Jan 88 - 31 Dec 92

Lt Col J.M. Alho; 01 Jan 93 -

15 RCD Regimental Sergeant Majors (RSM)

W01 J.D. Baptiste; 01 Jan 78 - 30 Sep 79

W02 P.L. Botha (Acting); 01 Jul 79 - 31 Jul 85

W01 D. Kruger; 01 Sep 85 - 30 Jun 91

W02 G.J. Snyman; 01 Jan 92 - 01 Jul 93

W01 C.J. Van Zyl; 01 Sep 93 - 31 May 97

W02 H.J. Shand (Acting); 01 Jun 97 - 31 Dec 97

W01 C.H. Lane-Blake; 01 Apr 98 - 31 Dec 99

W01 H.J. Shand; 01 Apr 00 -

== Insignia ==
15 Reception Depots heraldic interpretation was:

- The helmet represented the soldier.
- The colours were those of the Personnel Service Corps.
- The upward angle of the white background to a point represented the collecting of recruits.
- The beret badge was a Greek helmet with the motto "Perepi".

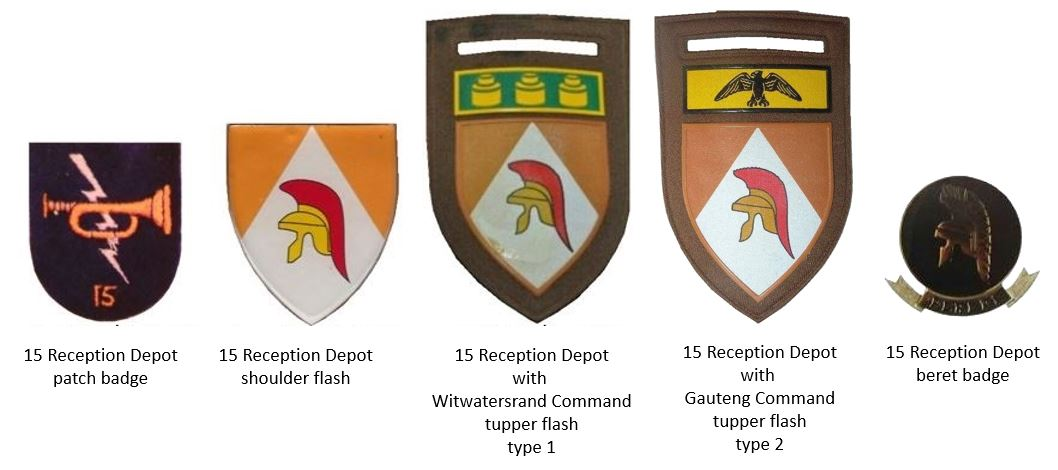
15 Reception Depot insignia
