= Cachalia =

Cachalia is a surname. Notable people with the surname include:

- Amina Cachalia (1930–2013), South African activist, politician and wife of Yusuf
- Azhar Cachalia (born 1956), judge of the Supreme Court of Appeal of South Africa and former anti-apartheid activist
- Firoz Cachalia (born 1958), South African lawyer and politician and former anti-apartheid activist
- Ghaleb Cachalia (born 1956), South African politician and son of Yusuf
- Ismail Ahmed "Moulvi" Cachalia (1908–2003), South African political activist and brother of Yusuf
- Ismail Mahomed Cachalia, (born 1929) South African politician and father of Azhar and Firoz
- Yusuf Cachalia, (1915–1995) South African anti-apartheid activist.
