= Wemmerpan Commando =

South African military unit

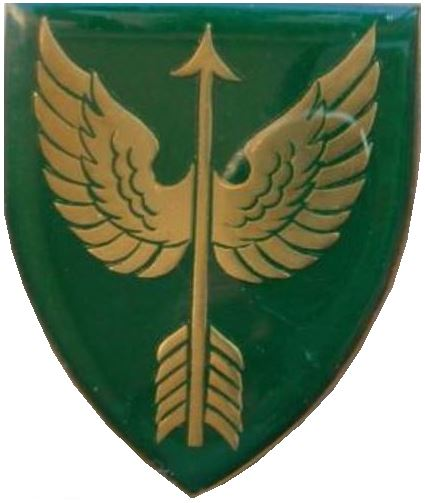
- Wemmerpan Commando emblem
- Active: 1962-
- Country: South Africa
- Allegiance: Republic of South Africa; Republic of South Africa
- Branch: South African Army; South African Army
- Type: Infantry
- Role: Light Infantry
- Size: One Battalion
- Part of: South African Infantry Corps; Army Territorial Reserve, Group 18
- Garrison/HQ: Wemmer Pan
- Motto(s): Non sibi sed patriae is a Latin phrase meaning "not for self

Wemmerpan Commando was a light infantry regiment of the South African Army. It formed part of the South African Army Infantry Formation as well as the South African Territorial Reserve.

== History ==
=== Origin ===
Approval was granted on 3 July 1962 for the establishment of the Wemmerpan Commando.

=== Operations ===
==== With the SADF ====
On 1 March 1963, the unit was activated under the command of Capt E.W. Meerbacher. The unit owed its name to the fact that it was situated near Wemmer Pan, an old gold mine in the southern suburbs of Johannesburg. Initially the unit used the Rosettenville Central School grounds as its parade ground. Around 1990 the unit was relocated to Doornkop Military Base, the old base was repurposed again for school use.

===== Headquarters =====
The first headquarters was situated in an old nursery school in Regents Park which was received from the City Council of Johannesburg.

The unit resorted under the command of Group 18.

===== Border Duty =====
The commando performed its first border duty in 1976 (October to December), the second in 1978 (January to March). In the mid 80's the unit was refocused to Urban warfare until its closure in 1994.

===== National Colours =====
On Tuesday 26 April 1994, Wemmerpan Commando laid up its National Colours at the South African National Museum of Military History. The laying up of National Colours followed a decision of the Defence Command Council that this should be done owing to the replacement of the National Flag by a new National Flag on 27 April 1994. The laying up of Colours is, in the life of any unit in possession of Colours, an occasion of supreme historical significance.

==== With the SANDF ====
===== Disbandment =====
This unit, along with all other Commando units was disbanded after a decision by South African President Thabo Mbeki to disband all Commando Units. The Commando system was phased out between 2003 and 2008 "because of the role it played in the apartheid era", according to the Minister of Safety and Security Charles Nqakula.

== Unit Insignia ==
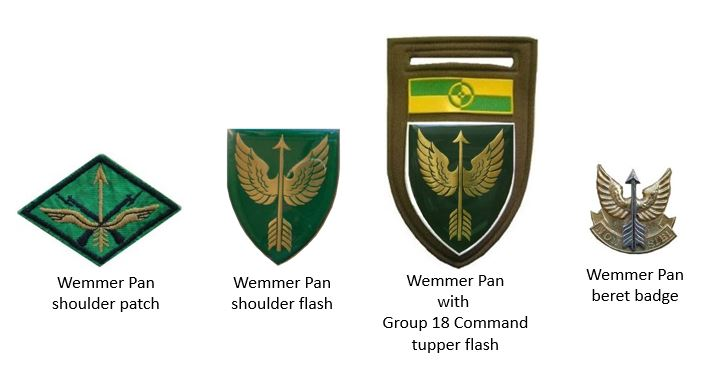
SADF era Wemmer Pan Commando insignia

== Leadership ==
- Cmdt E.W. Meerbacher 1963-1964
- Cmdt N.L. Whitaker 1964-1969
- Maj J. Schragenheim 1969-1970
- Cmdt F.R Johnstone 1970-1980
- Cmdt M.K. Wood 1980-1983
- Cmdt A.A. van Heerden 1984-1987
- Cmdt L.J. Leonard 1988-
- Cmdt D.V. Steyn -1994

== See also ==
- South African Commando System
