= Sandton Commando =

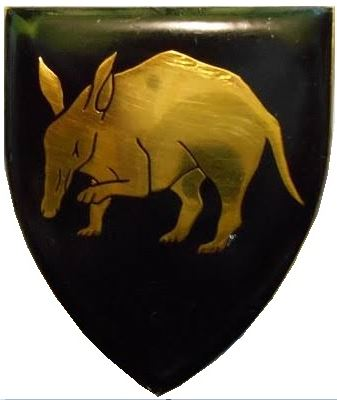
- Sandton Commando emblem
- Founded: 1962 (64 years ago)
- Disbanded: February 14, 2003 (23 years ago)
- Country: South Africa
- Allegiance: Republic of South Africa; Republic of South Africa
- Branch: South African Army; South African Army
- Type: Infantry
- Role: Light Infantry
- Size: One Battalion
- Part of: South African Infantry Corps; Army Territorial Reserve
- Garrison/HQ: Craighall
- Motto: Fortitude

Sandton Commando was a light infantry regiment of the South African Army. It formed part of the South African Army Infantry Formation as well as the South African Territorial Reserve.

== History ==
=== Origin ===
The Sandton Commando was founded in 1962 as the West Park Commando, one of four English speaking groups in the Johannesburg Area to be formed at that time.

=== Operations ===
==== With the SADF ====
The unit was renamed the Sandton Commando in 1969 with the establishment and naming of the new suburb. Since 1976 of the Commando volunteered and served with other operational units to combat terrorism.

During this era, the unit was mainly engaged in area force protection, search and cordons as well as other assistance to the local police.

As an urban unit, this commando was also tasked with protecting strategic facilities as well as quelling township riots especially during the State of Emergency in the 1980s.

===== The aardvark emblem =====
Around 1962 the unit started with training exercises at a property called Mapleton, northwest of the town of Heidelberg. The training area had numerous holes created by aardvarks which made training challenging.

===== Gate guard =====
A German 50mm PAK anti tank gun was the gate guard in front of the unit headquarters for at least 20 years.

===== Higher Command =====
Sandton Commando resorted under Group 18.

===== National Colours =====
On Tuesday 26 April 1994, Sandton Commando laid up its National Colours at the South African National Museum of Military History. The laying up of National Colours followed a decision of the Defence Command Council that this should be done owing to the replacement of the National Flag by a new National Flag on 27 April 1994. The laying up of Colours is, in the life of any unit in possession of Colours, an occasion of supreme historical significance.

==== With the SANDF ====
===== Disbandment =====
This unit, along with all other Commando units was disbanded after a decision by South African President Thabo Mbeki to disband all Commando Units. The Commando system was phased out between 2003 and 2008 "because of the role it played in the apartheid era", according to the Minister of Safety and Security Charles Nqakula.

=== Unit Insignia ===
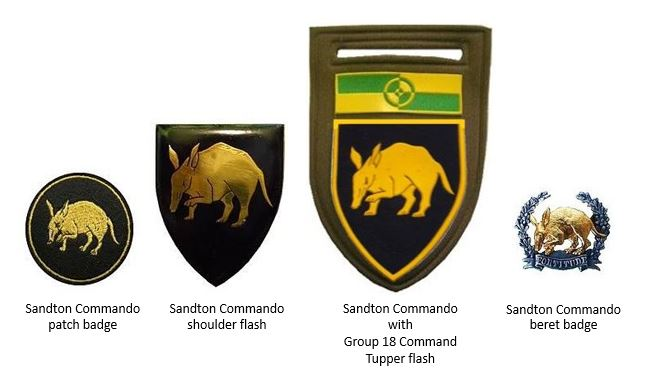
SADF era Sandton Commando insignia

== Leadership ==
Leadership
From	Honorary Colonels	To	Ribbon
	No known incumbents		
From	Commanding Officers	To	Ribbon
	No known incumbents		
From	Regimental Sergeants Major	To	Ribbon
	No known incumbents		

Col George Duxbury

== See also ==
- South African Commando System
