= Department of Police (South Africa) =

Law enforcement agency in South Africa

- List: 10 other official names: Sekretariaat vir Veiligheid en Sekuriteit (Afrikaans); IPhiko lezokuPhepha nokuVikeleka (Southern Ndebele); ICandelo loLawulo lwezoKhuselo noKhuseleko (Xhosa); Uphiko lwezokuPhepha nokuVikeleka (Zulu); Libandla leTekuphepha nekuVikeleka (Swazi); Lekala la Polokego le Tshireletsfo (Northern Sotho); Lekala la tsa Polokeho le Tshireletso (Sotho); Lefapha la Botsamaisi jwa Tshireletso le Pabalesego (Tswana); Huvo ya Vusirheleleki na Vuhlayisek (Tsonga); Vhueletshedzi ha zwa Vhudziki na Tsireledzo (Venda)

Department overview
- Jurisdiction: Government of South Africa
- Annual budget: R 120.89 billion (2025/26)
- Ministers responsible: Firoz Cachalia, Minister of Police; Polly Boshielo, Deputy Minister of Police; Cassel Mathale, Deputy Minister of Police
- Department executive: National Commissioner
- Website: www.saps.gov.za

The Department of Police (formerly known as the Department of Safety and Security) is a department of the South African government responsible for policing policy and oversight. The department is responsible for the South African Police Service (SAPS) and the Independent Police Investigative Directorate (IPID).

The current Minister of Police is Firoz Cachalia, who has held the position since August 2025, following the suspension of Senzo Mchunu.
