= Randburg Commando =

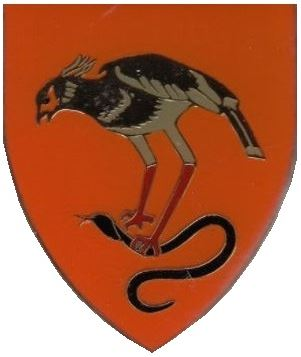
- Randburg Commando emblem
- Country: South Africa
- Allegiance: Republic of South Africa; Republic of South Africa
- Branch: South African Army; South African Army
- Type: Infantry
- Role: Light Infantry
- Size: One Battalion
- Part of: South African Infantry Corps; Army Territorial Reserve, Group 18
- Garrison/HQ: Randburg
- Motto(s): Unguibus et rostro (Claws and Beak)

Randburg Commando was a light infantry regiment of the South African Army. It formed part of the South African Army Infantry Formation as well as the South African Territorial Reserve.

== History ==
=== Operations ===
==== With the SADF ====
The unit resorted under the command of the SADF's Group 18. During this era, the unit was mainly engaged in area force protection, search and cordons as well as other assistance to the local police.

As an urban unit, this commando was also tasked with protecting strategic facilities as well as quelling township riots especially during the State of Emergency in the 1980s.

===== National Colours =====
On Tuesday 26 April 1994, Randburg Commando laid up its National Colours at the South African National Museum of Military History. The laying up of National Colours followed a decision of the Defence Command Council that this should be done owing to the replacement of the National Flag by a new National Flag on 27 April 1994. The laying up of Colours is, in the life of any unit in possession of Colours, an occasion of supreme historical significance.

==== With the SANDF ====
===== Disbandment =====
This unit, along with all other Commando units was disbanded after a decision by South African President Thabo Mbeki to disband all Commando Units. The Commando system was phased out between 2003 and 2008 "because of the role it played in the apartheid era", according to the Minister of Safety and Security Charles Nqakula.

== Unit Insignia ==
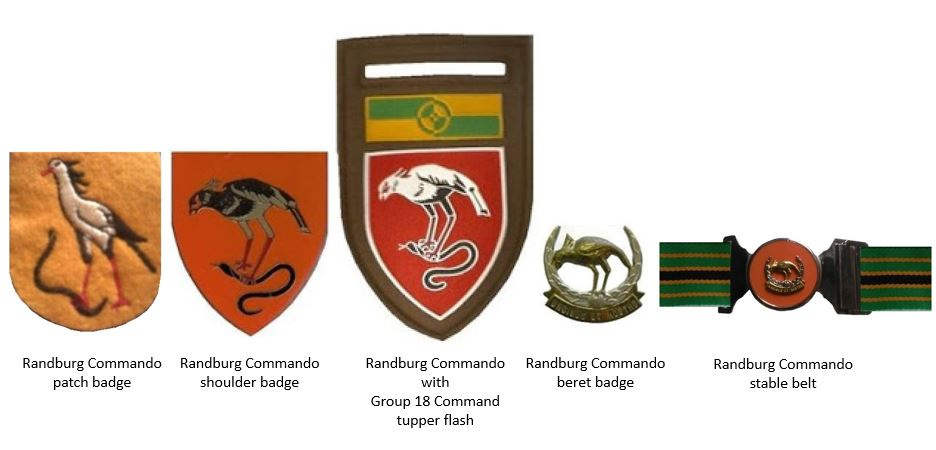
SADF era Randburg Commando insignia

== See also ==
- South African Commando System
