= Johannesburg East Commando =

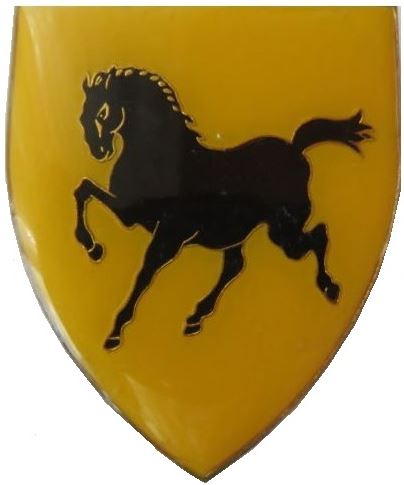
- Johannesburg East Commando/Johannesburg South Regiment emblem
- Active: 1924-2006
- Country: South Africa
- Allegiance: Republic of South Africa; Republic of South Africa
- Branch: South African Army; South African Army
- Type: Infantry
- Role: Light Infantry
- Size: One Battalion
- Part of: South African Infantry Corps; Army Territorial Reserve, Group 18
- Garrison/HQ: Doornkop Military Base in the 1970s, Union Grounds in the 1980s
- Motto(s): Op wag (on guard)

Johannesburg East Commando was a light infantry regiment of the South African Army. It formed part of the South African Army Infantry Formation as well as the South African Territorial Reserve.

== History ==
=== Origin ===
The Johannesburg East Defence Association was raised on 4 November 1924 under Government Gazette 24/1064 with its headquarters in Johan Rissik School in Troyeville.

=== Operations ===
==== With the UDF ====
By 1950 the association was renamed as the Johannesburg East Commando.

==== With the SADF ====
The unit resorted under the command of the SADF's Group 18.

During this era, the unit was mainly engaged in area force protection, search and cordons as well as other assistance to the local police.

As an urban unit, this commando was also tasked with protecting strategic facilities as well as quelling township riots especially during the State of Emergency in the 1980s.

===== Commando to Regiment =====
In 1979 however the unit was renamed the Johannesburg South Commando and by 1983, the unit finally renamed again as the Johannesburg South Regiment.

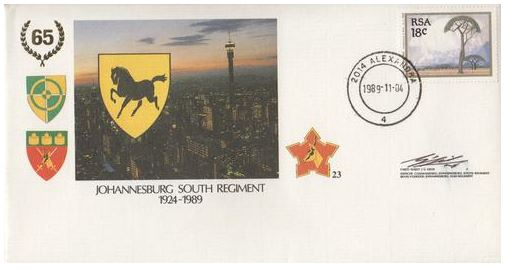
SADF era Regiment Johannesburg South commemorative letter

The regiment developed into an urban counter insurgency unit, but was also involved in border duty.

This was the only regiment under the command of Group 18 HQ.

==== With the SANDF ====
===== Disbandment =====
This unit, along with all other Commando units was disbanded after a decision by South African President Thabo Mbeki to disband all Commando Units. The Commando system was phased out between 2003 and 2008 "because of the role it played in the apartheid era", according to the Minister of Safety and Security Charles Nqakula.

== Unit Insignia ==
The units symbol was a black stallion reminiscent of the horse commandos of the Boer armies. The gold background symbolised the gold mining industry of the area.

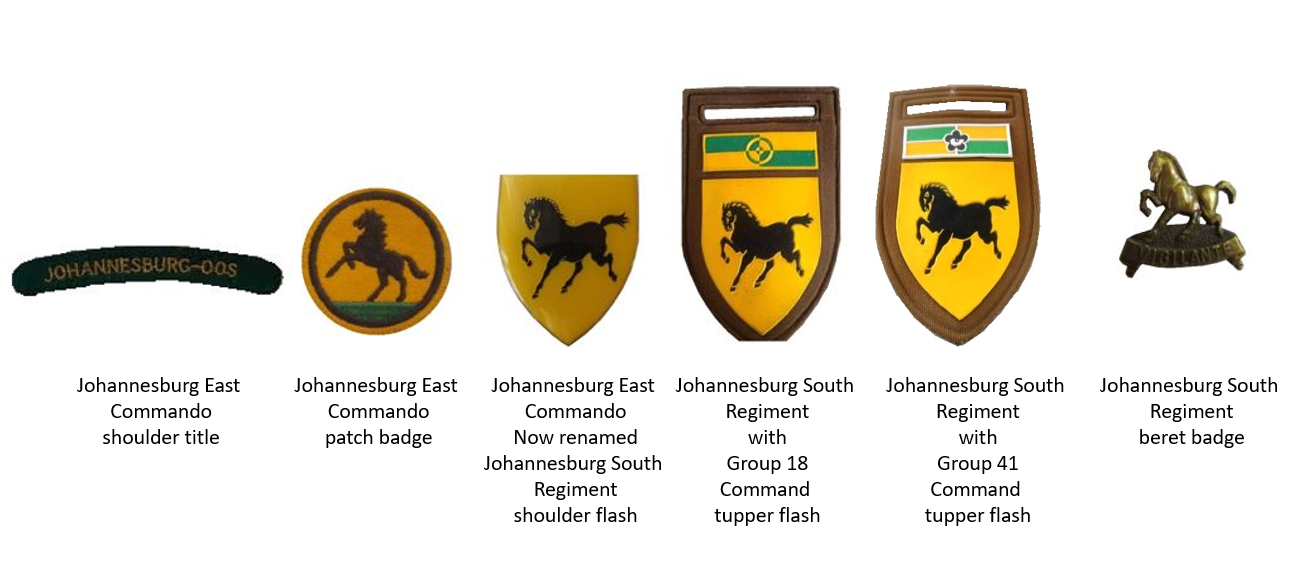
SADF era Johannesburg South Regiment Insignia

== Leadership ==
- Cmdt. Johannes Petrus Frederik Kirsten -1966
- Cmdt. Adriaan Jacobus Viljoen 1966 - 1976
- Cmdt G.J. Gees 1985-

== See also ==
- South African Commando System
