= Gatsrand Commando =

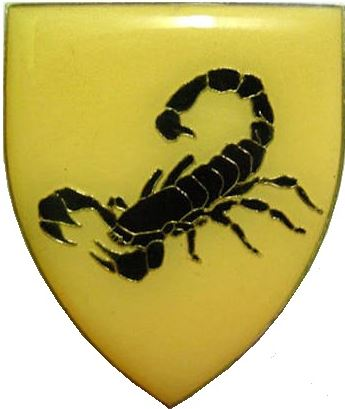
- Gatsrand Commando emblem
- Country: South Africa
- Allegiance: Republic of South Africa; Republic of South Africa
- Branch: South African Army; South African Army
- Type: Infantry
- Role: Light Infantry
- Size: One Battalion
- Part of: South African Infantry Corps; Army Territorial Reserve, Group 30
- Garrison/HQ: Carletonville, Fochville
- Mottos: "Facta non verba", Deeds not words

Gatsrand Commando was a light infantry regiment of the South African Army. It formed part of the South African Army Infantry Formation as well as the South African Territorial Reserve.

== History ==
=== Operations ===
==== With the SADF ====
During this era, the unit was mainly used for area force protection, search and cordones as well as stock theft control assistance to the rural police.

The unit resorted under the command of the SADF's Group 30.

==== With the SANDF ====
===== Disbandment =====
This unit, along with all other Commando units was disbanded after a decision by South African President Thabo Mbeki to disband all Commando Units. The Commando system was phased out between 2003 and 2008 "because of the role it played in the apartheid era", according to the Minister of Safety and Security Charles Nqakula.

== Unit Insignia ==
Its unit insignia featured a scorpion.

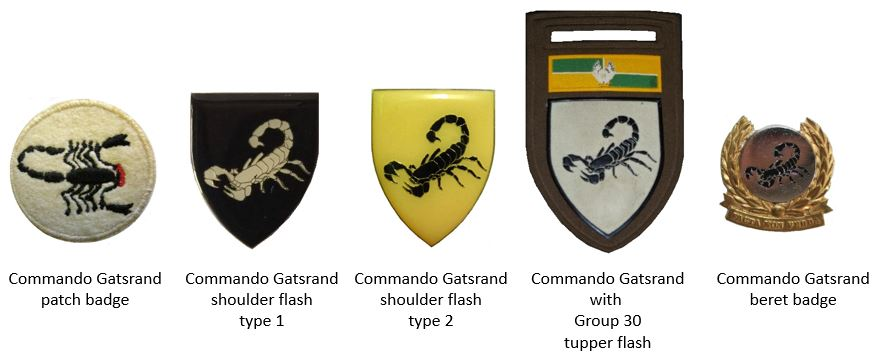
SADF era Commando Gatsrand insignia

== Leadership ==
Leadership
From	Honorary Colonels	To	Ribbon
	No known incumbents		
From	Commanding Officers	To	Ribbon
	No known incumbents		
From	Regimental Sergeants Major	To	Ribbon
	No known incumbents		

== See also ==
- South African Commando System
