= Meyerton Commando =

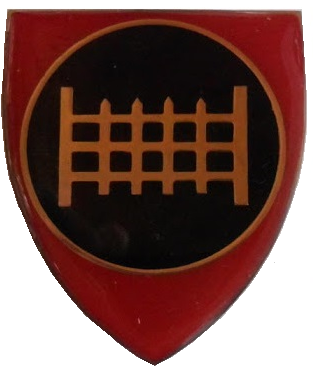
- Meyerton Commando emblem
- Active: 1971-
- Country: South Africa
- Allegiance: Republic of South Africa; Republic of South Africa
- Branch: South African Army; South African Army
- Type: Infantry
- Role: Light Infantry
- Size: One Battalion
- Part of: South African Infantry Corps; Army Territorial Reserve, Group 17
- Garrison/HQ: Meyerton

Meyerton Commando was a light infantry regiment of the South African Army. It formed part of the South African Army Infantry Formation as well as the South African Territorial Reserve.

== History ==
=== Origin ===
This unit was originally known as the De Deur Commando.

=== Operations ===
==== With the SADF ====
The units changed its name to the Meyerton Commando from 1 January 1971.

During the retirement function of Commandant Dirk Burger in May 1975, a revue parade was held in Meyerton.

The old school building of Laerskool Voorwaarts was used as its headquarters from 1982.

===== Freedom of Entry =====
The unit received its Freedom of Entry to Meyerton on 10 April 1984.

==== With the SANDF ====
===== Disbandment =====
This unit, along with all other Commando units was disbanded after a decision by South African President Thabo Mbeki to disband all Commando Units. The Commando system was phased out between 2003 and 2008 "because of the role it played in the apartheid era", according to the Minister of Safety and Security Charles Nqakula.

== Leadership ==
Leadership
From	Honorary Colonels	To	Ribbon
XXX	XXX	XXX	
From	Commanding Officers	To	Ribbon
1975	Cmdt D Burger	nd	
1980	Cmdt E Weilbach	nd	
From	Regimental Sergeants Major	To	Ribbon
XXX	XXX MMM,JCD	XXX	Military Merit Medal MMM John Chard Decoration JCD

== Unit Insignia ==
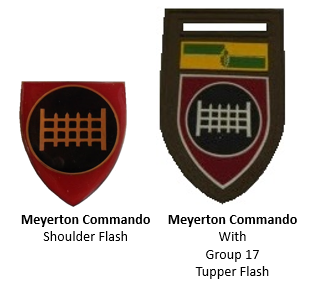
Meyerton Commando insignia

== See also ==
- South African Commando System
