= Modderfontein =

Modderfontein can refer to:

- Battle of Elands River (1901)
- Modderfontein Commando
- Modderfontein (East Rand)
- Modderfontein (House of Assembly of South Africa constituency)
- Modderfontein Stadium
