= Vereeniging Commando =

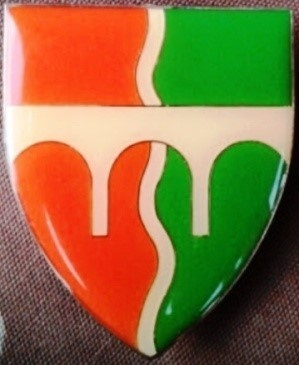
- Active: c. 1921–2006
- Disbanded: 29 September 2006
- Country: South Africa
- Allegiance: Union Defence Force; Republic of South Africa; Republic of South Africa
- Branch: South African Army; South African Army
- Type: Infantry
- Role: Light Infantry
- Size: One Battalion
- Part of: South African Infantry Corps; Army Territorial Reserve, Group 17
- Garrison/HQ: Vereeniging
- Mottos: ENSE ET ARATRO Serving in War and Peace (Afrikaans: Dien in Oorlog en Vrede)

Vereeniging Commando was a light infantry regiment of the South African Army. It formed part of the South African Army Infantry Formation as well as the South African Territorial Reserve.

== History ==
=== Origin ===
The Vereeniging Commando was formed in 1921 as a Shooting Commando and its first Commander was Lt Col Karel Rood.

=== Operations ===
==== With the UDF ====
The Shooting Commando received its official status as a Commando in 1957 and in 1961 received its first Citizen Force members.

==== With the SADF ====
During this era, the unit was mainly used for area force protection, search and cordones as well as stock theft control assistance to the rural police.

===== Freedom of Entry =====
The Commando received the Freedom of Entry to the city of Vereeniging on 14 February 1976.

===== National Colours =====
On 16 August 1991, the commanding officer Cmdt J.C. Kruger, accepted the award of National Colours on behalf of the unit.

==== With the SANDF ====
===== Disbandment =====
This unit, along with all other Commando units was disbanded after a decision by South African President Thabo Mbeki to disband all Commando Units. The Commando system was phased out between 2003 and 2008 "because of the role it played in the apartheid era", according to the Minister of Safety and Security Charles Nqakula.

On Friday 29 September 2006 Vereeniging Commando finally closed its doors when Lt Col J.C. Zelie handed the VMB keys over to the Department of Public Works.

== Insignia ==
Insignia
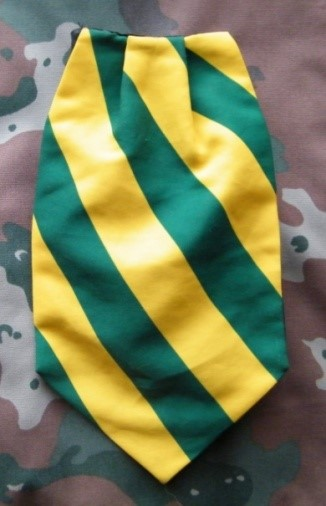
Cravat

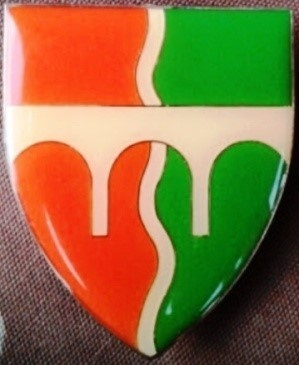
Flash

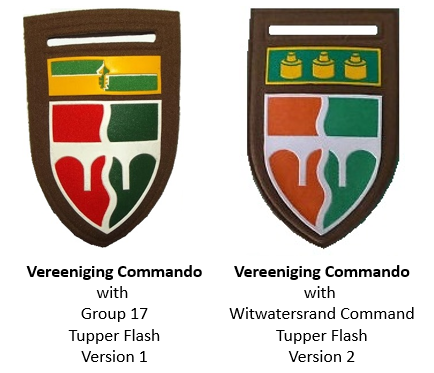
Tupper Flashes

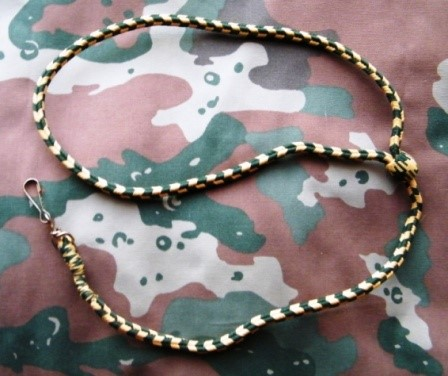
Lanyard

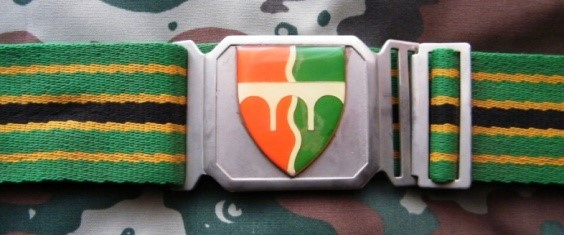
Stable Belt

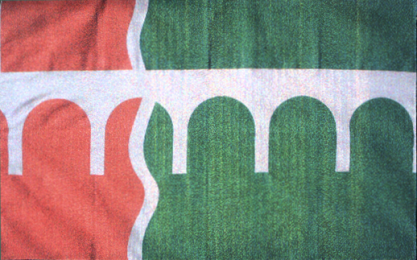
Unit Flag

== Leadership ==
Leadership
From	Honorary Colonels	To	Ribbon
1991	Col (Dr) M. Milani	2006	
From	Commanding Officers	To	Ribbon
1921	Lt Col K. Rood	1929	
1929	Lt Col E. Rood	1939	
1939	Lt Col E.S. Rood	1946	
1946	Cmdt J.J. Marais	1948	
August 1949	Cmdt F.H.V. Lamont	November 1949	
1950	Cmdt G. de Bruyn-Nel	1967	
1967	Cmdt F.P. van Niekerk	1977	
1977	Cmdt W.A. de Klerk	1981	
1981	Cmdt J.P. Arnold	1985	
1985	Cmdt T.C. Pieterse	1989	
1989	Cmdt J.C. Kruger	1994	
1994	Cmdt B.M. Steyn	1997	
1997	Lt Col J.C. Zelie	2006	
From	Regimental Sergeants Major	To	Ribbon
1967	WO1 D.B. Oliver	1976	
1977	WO1 W.A. Bobbert	1982	
1982	WO1 M.L. van Stratten	1989	
1989	WO1 P.F. Strachan	1991	
1991	WO1 E. Jonker	1994	
1994	WO1 D.J. Labuschagne	2006	

== See also ==
- South African Commando System
