= Bertram Armstrong =

Major General Bertram Frank Armstrong DSO
- Born: 1893
- Died: 1972 (aged 78–79)
- Military career
- Allegiance: Republic of South Africa
- Branch: South African Army
- Rank: Major General
- Commands: 5th South African Brigade; Natal Command; Witwatersrand Command; Quartermaster General; Chief of the General Staff
- Conflicts: Western Desert Campaign
- Awards: Distinguished Service Order DSO

Major General Bertram Frank Armstrong DSO (1893–1972) was a South African General officer. He was the commanding officer of the 5th South African Brigade in the Western Desert Campaign in North Africa during World War II.

== Military career ==
General Armstrong joined the Natal Police in 1910 and was transferred to the South African Mounted Rifles in 1913.

He served in the British Army during World War I, but returned to the Union Defence Force in 1919. In 1923 he was shifted to the Garrison Artillery, and became the commanding officer in 1933.

At the outbreak of World War II, he served as Major General and commander of Natal Command and later as commander of 5th South African Brigade in North Africa. During this period he was taken prisoner of war. After his escape in 1944, he served as commander of Witwatersrand Command.

He later served as Quartermaster-General and Chief of the General Staff.

He retired on 28 January 1953.

== Awards and decorations ==
- Companion of the Distinguished Service Order (DSO)
