= Hector Daniel =

South African Air Force general

Brigadier Hector Cyril Daniel CBE MC AFC
- Born: 19 October 1898; Senekal, Orange Free State, South Africa
- Died: 28 December 1953 (aged 55); Pretoria, Transvaal, South Africa
- Relatives: Brigadier John Daniel SAAF (Brother)
- Military career
- Allegiance: United Kingdom; Union of South Africa
- Branch: Royal Flying Corps (1917–1918); Royal Air Force (1918–1919); South African Air Force (1923–1951)
- Service years: 1914–1917
- Rank: Brigadier
- Units: No. 43 Squadron (1917–1918); No. 70 Squadron (1918); 3 Fighting School
- Conflicts: Western Front; World War II
- Awards: Order of the British Empire CBE Military Cross MC Air Force Cross (United Kingdom) AFC

Brigadier Hector Cyril Daniel CBE MC AFC (1898 – 28 December 1953) was a South African military commander. He served in the Royal Air Force in World War I, becoming an ace with nine aerial victories, and joined the South African Air Force in 1923.

He was Director of Air and Technical Services (head of the SAAF) from 1937 until the outbreak of World War II in 1939, when he was appointed Officer Commanding SAAF Headquarters. During the war, he was Inspector of the SAAF in 1940, senior SAAF officer in East Africa from 1940 to 1941, and Air Officer Commanding 24 Group from 1941.

Brigadier Daniel retired in 1953. He died by his own hand.

== Military honors ==
=== List of Awards ===
- Order of the British Empire (Commander) (CBE)
- Military Cross (MC)
- Air Force Cross (United Kingdom) (AFC)

== See also ==
- List of South African military chiefs
- South African Air Force

Military offices
Preceded by Francis Hoare	Director Air Services, South African Air Force; 1937–1939	Succeeded by John Holthouse
