= John Holthouse =

South African Air Force general

Brigadier John Holthouse OBE
- Born: 19 April 1891
- Died: 1964 (aged 72–73)
- Military career
- Allegiance: South Africa
- Branch: South African Air Force
- Rank: Brigadier
- Commands: Chief of the South African Air Force
- Wars: World War II
- Awards: Order of the British Empire OBE

Brigadier John Holthouse OBE (19 April 1891 – 1964) was a South African military commander.

He joined the Royal Air Force in 1918 and transferred to the South African Air Force in January 1921.

He became the Air Forces Camp Commandant at Robert's Heights and OC of the Aircraft and Artillery Depot on 1 May 1933. From 1936 he served with the Railways and Harbours Air Service.

He served as Director of Air Services from 13 September 1939 to 3 November 1939 and then Director General Air Services from 4 November 1939 to 25 November 1940.

In World War II he was Air and Military Attache in the United States.

He left the Union Defence Force on 31 October 1945.

== Awards ==
- Order of the British Empire (OBE)

== See also ==
- List of South African military chiefs
- South African Air Force

Military offices
Preceded by Hector Daniel	Director Air Services, South African Air Force; 1939–1940	Succeeded by Christoffel Venter
Unknown	OC of the Aircraft and Artillery Depot; 1 May 1933–1936	Unknown
