= Christoffel Venter =

South African military commander

Major General Christoffel Johannes Venter CB DFC & Bar
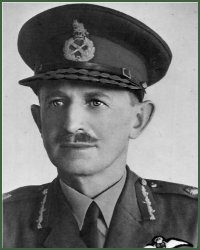
- Born: 1 November 1892 near Middelburg, Cape Colony
- Died: 20 February 1977 (aged 84); Lyttelton, Pretoria
- Military career
- Allegiance: United Kingdom; Union of South Africa
- Branch: Aviation
- Rank: Major General
- Nickname: Boetie
- Wars: World War I
- Awards: Order of the Bath CB Distinguished Flying Cross and Bar (United Kingdom) DFC & Bar British War Medal Victory Medal (South Africa) MID King George V Coronation Medal King George VI Coronation Medal Military Cross
- Other work: Managing Director South African Airways

Major-General Christoffel 'Boetie' Venter CB DFC & bar, (1 November 1892 – 20 February 1977) was a South African military commander.

== Military career ==
He joined the 7^{th} Mounted Rifles in 1912 then the 5^{th} SAMR in August 1914 for service in South West Africa. He joined 1 South African Infantry Battalion in 1916 and served in France until he transferred to the Royal Flying Corps in February 1917. He was shot down and captured in 1918. He won the DFC and bar and was credited with 16 aerial victories, and joined the South African Air Force in 1922.

He commanded 1 Squadron SAAF and served as Officer Commanding Wits Command in 1936.

He was Director-General of the Air Force from 1940 to 1945. After World War II, he was managing director of South African Airways.

== Honours and awards ==
=== Companion of the Order of the Bath ===
Then Major General Venter was made a Companion of the Order of the Bath on 1 January 1944

The notice in the London Gazette reads as follows:

The KING has been graciously pleased, on the advice of His Majesty's Ministers for the Union of South Africa, to give orders for the following appointment to the Most Honourable Order of the Bath:

To be an Additional Member of the Military Division of the Third Class, or Companions, of the said Most Honourable Order:

Temporary Major General Christoffel Johannes Venter, D.F.C., South African Staff Corps

=== Distinguished Flying Cross ===
Lieutenant Venter was awarded the Distinguished Flying Cross in 1918. The notice in the London Gazette reads as follows:

Lt. Christoffel Johannes Venter.

During recent operations this officer shot down five enemy aeroplanes, one of which he followed down to 500 feet, when it was seen to fall.

He is a bold and skilful airman.

=== Bar to the Distinguished Flying Cross ===
In November 1918 he was awarded a bar to his Distinguished Flying Cross The notice in the London Gazette reads as follows:

Lt. (T./Capt.) Christoffel Johannes Venter, D.F.C. A brilliant patrol leader, who has since May last destroyed eleven enemy machines. In an engagement between six of our machines and nine of the enemy, five of the latter were destroyed, Captain Venter accounting for one. Later on the same day he, in company with three other officers, engaged four Fokkers. In the combat that followed all four enemy machines were destroyed, this officer shooting down one.

=== List ===
- Order of the Bath (Companion) (CB)
- Distinguished Flying Cross and Bar (United Kingdom) (DFC & Bar)
- British War Medal
- Victory Medal (South Africa) (Mentioned in Dispatches) (MID)
- King George V Coronation Medal
- King George VI Coronation Medal
- Order of the Phoenix (Greece)
- Military Cross (Belgium)

== See also ==
- List of South African military chiefs
- South African Air Force

== Sources ==
Military offices
Preceded by John Holthouse	Director Air Services, South African Air Force; 1940–1945	Succeeded by Jimmy Durrant
Unknown	OC Witwatersrand Command; 1936–1938	Succeeded by Charlie Ross
