= Francis Hoare =

South African Air Force general

Major General Francis Hoare CB CBE
- Born: Francis Richard Gurney Hoare; 14 December 1879; Frognal, Hampstead, London
- Died: 31 May 1959 (aged 79); Pretoria, Transvaal, Union of South Africa
- Military career
- Allegiance: South Africa
- Branch: South African Air Force
- Service years: 1894–1937; 1939–1945
- Rank: Major General
- Commands: Director-General of Technical Services
- Wars: World War I
- Awards: Order of the Bath CB Order of the British Empire CBE

Major General Francis Richard Gurney Hoare CB CBE (14 December 1879 – 31 May 1959) was a South African military commander.

Born in Frognal, Hampstead, London, he was educated at Harrow School and Trinity College, Cambridge. He joined the British Army in 1894. He served in the Anglo-Boer War, after which he settled in the Transvaal as a civil servant.

He joined the Transvaal Horse Artillery in 1912. Shortly after the outbreak of World War I in 1914, he was seconded to the British Army as an officer in the Army Ordnance Department. From there he transferred to the Royal Flying Corps in 1917.

Lt Col Hoare returned to South Africa after the war, and became a founder member of the South African Air Force on its formation in 1920. He was Staff Officer for Air Equipment at Defence Headquarters from 1921 to 1933.

From 1933 to 1937, he served as the Union Defence Forces' Director Of Technical Services, and was briefly Director of Air and Technical Services (with the rank of colonel) before retiring in 1937.

He returned to active duty in 1939 and served as Director-General of Technical Services again from 1939 to 1940. For the rest of World War II, he was involved in arms production and procurement. He retired again at the end of the war.

== Awards ==
He was made a Commander of the Order of the British Empire for his World War I services. In 1944, he was made a Companion of the Order of the Bath.

- Order of the Bath (Companion) (CB)
- Order of the British Empire (Commander) (CBE)

== See also ==
- List of South African military chiefs
- South African Air Force

Military offices
Vacant Title last held by Sir Pierre van Ryneveld	Director Air Services, South African Air Force; 1937	Succeeded by Hector Daniel
Unknown	Union Defence Force Director Of Technical Services; 1937–1937	Unknown
