= Modderfontein Commando =

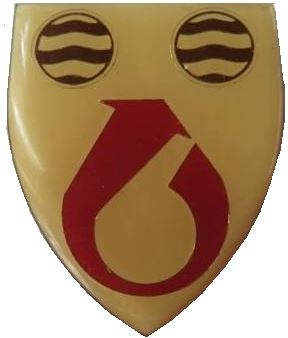
- Modderfontein Industrial Commando emblem
- Founded: 1969 (56 years ago)
- Disbanded: 14 February 2003
- Country: South Africa
- Allegiance: Republic of South Africa; Republic of South Africa
- Branch: South African Army; South African Army
- Type: Infantry
- Role: Light Infantry
- Size: One Battalion
- Part of: South African Infantry Corps; Army Territorial Reserve
- Garrison/HQ: Modderfontein, Johannesburg

The Modderfontein Commando was a light infantry unit of the South African Army. It formed part of the South African Army Infantry Formation as well as the South African Territorial Reserve under the Commando System.

It was phased out in 2003-2008 along with the rest of the commando system due to its role in Apartheid.

== History ==
=== Origin ===
The Modderfontein Commando was tasked with the protection of the Modderfontein Dynamite Factory, South Africa's biggest manufacturer of explosives.

=== Operations ===
==== Within the South African Defence Force (SADF) ====
In 1969, the Modderfontein Dynamite Factory was placed under the protection of the Republic Defence Force (SADF). Before then, the factory was protected by a unit of the National Volunteer Battalion (NVB) that was made up of "keymen" and other volunteers. In 1946 the NVB units were retired.

The Modderfontein Commando was initially formed as an urban commando unit but was restructured in the early 1980s into an industrial commando unit tasked with protecting the complex at Modderfontein. Specialized personnel allocated to the commando was largely drawn from men working for AECI who had a military commitment.

The Commando was structured into a headquarter with four companies.

==== Within the South African National Defence Force (SANDF) ====
===== Disbandment =====
This unit, along with all other Commando units, were disbanded after a decision by South African President Thabo Mbeki. According to the Minister of Safety and Security, Charles Nqakula, the Commando system was phased out between 2003 and 2008 "because of the role it played in the apartheid era."

== Unit Insignia ==
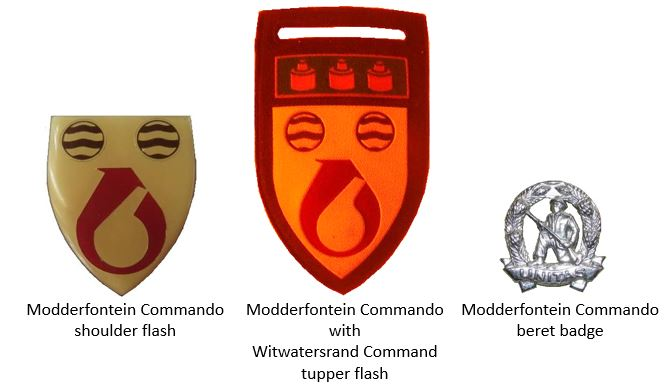
SADF era Modderfontein Industrial Commando insignia

== See also ==
- South African Commando System
