= Azhar Cachalia =

South African judge (born 1956)

The Honourable Azhar Cachalia

Judge of the Supreme Court of Appeal of South Africa
- In office 2006–2021

Judge of the Johannesburg High Court
- In office 2001–2005

Personal details
- Born: 26 June 1956 (age 70) Edinburgh, Scotland
- Relations: Ismail Cachalia (father); Firoz Cachalia (brother)
- Education: University of the Witwatersrand
- Profession: Attorney

Azhar Cachalia (born 26 June 1956) is a former judge of the Supreme Court of Appeal of South Africa and former anti-apartheid activist for the United Democratic Front.

== Early life and education ==
Cachalia was born in Scotland and received his schooling in Benoni, South Africa. He attended the University of the Witwatersrand obtaining his BA degree and his LLB degree in 1983. After graduating he was admitted as an attorney and while working as an attorney, he obtained a H Dip Tax Law. His brother is politician Firoz Cachalia.

== Career ==
Cachalia was a founding member of United Democratic Front (a coalition of anti-apartheid organisations) in 1983. Due to his anti-apartheid activities during the late 1980s, he was detained on several occasions by the South African Police. In 1988 he joined the law firm, Cheadle Thompson & Haysom in Johannesburg as an attorney, becoming a partner and practised at the firm until 1996 when he joined the South African Government as Secretary of Safety and Security.

In January 2001, Cachalia received an Acting Judge appointment at the Johannesburg High Court and in September 2001 he was permanently appointed Judge of the High Court. After serving as acting Judge of Appeal in 2005, he became a Judge of the Supreme Court of Appeal of South Africa in 2006.
