= Ismail Mahomed Cachalia =

South African politician

Member of the National Assembly
- In office 3 July 2001 – May 2009
- Constituency: Gauteng

Personal details
- Born: 20 December 1929 (age 96)
- Citizenship: South Africa
- Party: African National Congress
- Children: Firoz Cachalia; Azhar Cachalia

Ismail Mahomed Cachalia (born 20 December 1929) is a retired South African politician who represented the African National Congress (ANC) in the National Assembly from 2001 to 2009. He also served an earlier partial term in the first democratic Parliament.

== Legislative career ==
Cachalia was born on 20 December 1929. He was first elected to the National Assembly in 1994, in South Africa's first post-apartheid elections, but he resigned from his seat before the end of the legislative term. He returned in the middle of the next legislative term, on 3 July 2001, when he was sworn in to fill the casual vacancy caused by Melanie Verwoerd's resignation. He was elected to a full term in the seat in the 2004 general election, representing the Gauteng constituency, and retired after the 2009 general election.

== Personal life ==
He is a member of South Africa's politically illustrious Cachalia family: he is the father of Firoz Cachalia and Azhar Cachalia, and he is also related to Ghaleb Cachalia.
