= Firoz Cachalia =

South African politician (born 1958)

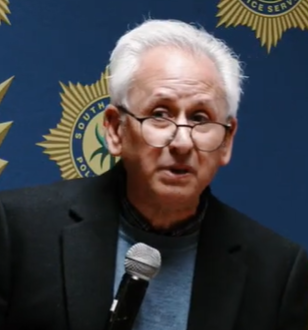
- Cachalia in 2025

Minister of Police
- Acting
- Assumed office 13 July 2025
- President: Cyril Ramaphosa
- Minister: Senzo Mchunu (suspended)

Member of the Gauteng Executive Council for Economic Development
- In office May 2009 – November 2010
- Premier: Nomvula Mokonyane
- Succeeded by: Qedani Mahlangu

Member of the Gauteng Executive Council for Community Safety
- In office April 2004 – May 2009
- Premier: Mbhazima Shilowa; Paul Mashatile
- Preceded by: Nomvula Mokonyane (for Safety and Community Liaison)
- Succeeded by: Khabisi Mosunkutu

Personal details
- Born: 22 July 1958 (age 68) Benoni, Transvaal; Union of South Africa
- Party: African National Congress
- Other political affiliations: South African Communist Party
- Relations: Ismail Cachalia (father); Azhar Cachalia (brother)

Firoz Cachalia (born 22 July 1958) is a South African lawyer and politician who is the current acting Minister of Police. He previously served as a Member of the Gauteng Executive Council from 2004 to 2010. Formerly an anti-apartheid activist in the Transvaal, he first joined the Gauteng Provincial Legislature in 1994, representing the African National Congress, and he served as Speaker of the provincial legislature from 1999 to 2004. After he left the provincial government he was appointed as a law professor at Wits University and, from 2022, as the chairperson of the National Anti-Corruption Advisory Council.

== Early life and education ==
Cachalia was born on 22 July 1958 in Benoni in the former Transvaal, now part of Gauteng province. His brother is Azhar Cachalia, an activist and judge. In the late 1970s and 1980s, Cachalia was active in anti-apartheid student politics at Wits University; he was detained several times and banned under the Internal Security Act. He also joined the United Democratic Front. In the early 1990s, he worked as a lawyer at Bell Dewar and Hall and as a researcher at the Centre for Applied Legal Studies; he also represented the Transvaal Indian Congress during negotiations at the Convention for a Democratic South Africa. He holds a Bachelor of Arts and an LLB, and in 1996 he received an LLM from the University of Michigan.

== Political career ==
Cachalia first joined the Gauteng Provincial Legislature in 1994 and he ultimately became Speaker of the provincial legislature from 1999 to 2004. In the legislature he represented the African National Congress; he was also a member of the South African Communist Party.

On 29 April 2004, following the 2004 general election, Cachalia was appointed for the first time to the Gauteng Executive Council; Mbhazima Shilowa, then entering his second term as Premier of Gauteng, appointed him Member of the Executive Council (MEC) for Community Safety. He retained that portfolio until the 2009 general election, throughout Shilowa's second term and the brief tenure of Shilowa's successor, Paul Mashatile. From May 2009, under newly elected Premier Nomvula Mokonyane, Cachalia was MEC for Economic Development, a newly created portfolio. However, he was fired from the Executive Council in a cabinet reshuffle announced by Mokonyane on 2 November 2010.

On 13 July 2025, he was appointed as the national Minister of Police, replacing Senzo Mchunu, in an acting capacity.

== Academic career ==
Following his time in provincial government, Cachalia subsequently became a professor at the Wits University School of Law. In July 2012, President Jacob Zuma appointed him to a three-year term as non-executive director on the board of the South African Reserve Bank. In September 2022, Cachalia began a three-year term as chairperson of the National Anti-Corruption Advisory Council, a body newly created by Zuma's successor, President Cyril Ramaphosa, to prevent and eradicate corruption and state capture, including by guiding the government's response to the findings of the Zondo Commission. He also served until December 2022 as a member of the National Executive Committee of his political party, the ANC; he was co-opted onto the body in October 2019.

== Civil society appointments ==
Cachalia has served in various positions in civil society organisations. He is chairperson of the Trust of former president Kgalema Motlanthe. He served on the board of the Ahmed Kathrada Foundation and the board of Corruption Watch from 2018 to 2023.

A blogger criticised his associations at these civil society organisations. Cachalia's fellow trustee at the Kgalema Motlanthe Foundation, Maurizio Mariano, was named as a potential witness to an attempt to solicit a bribe by convicted advocate Seth Nthai. However, days before Cachalia was appointed police minister the State settled with Nthai meaning that the allegation against Mariano was never tested.

One of Cachalia's fellow board members at Corruption Watch during his tenure, Thabi Leoka, was later exposed to have lied about her qualifications. Cachalia has never commented on the matter.
