= Minister of Police (South Africa) =

Police of South Africa

South Africa Minister of Police
- Flag of South Africa

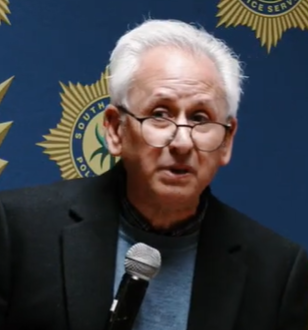
- Incumbent; Firoz Cachalia
- Department of Police
- Style: The Honourable
- Member of: Cabinet
- Appointer: President of South Africa
- Deputy: Polly Boshielo; Cassel Mathale
- Website: South African Police Service

The minister of police is the minister in the Cabinet of South Africa with political responsibility for the Department of Police, including the South African Police Service, the Independent Police Investigative Directorate, the Private Security industry Regulatory Authority, and the Civilian Secretariat for Police. The office was called the minister of safety and security between 1994 and 2009, and before that it was the minister of law and order.

== Ministers ==
Name	Portrait	Term	Party	President
Sydney Mufamadi		1994–1999	ANC	Nelson Mandela
Steve Tshwete		1999–2002	ANC	Thabo Mbeki
Charles Nqakula		2002–2008	ANC	Thabo Mbeki
Nathi Mthethwa		2008-2014	ANC	Kgalema Motlanthe; Jacob Zuma
Nathi Nhleko		2014–2017	ANC	Jacob Zuma
Fikile Mbalula		2017–2018	ANC	Jacob Zuma
Bheki Cele		2018–2024	ANC	Cyril Ramaphosa
Senzo Mchunu		2024–2025	ANC	Cyril Ramaphosa
Firoz Cachalia		2025–present	ANC	Cyril Ramaphosa
