= Charles Nqakula =

South African politician

The Honourable Charles Nqakula MP

High Commissioner to the Republic of Mozambique from South Africa
- In office 24 June 2012 – 2017 or earlier
- President: Jacob Zuma Cyril Ramaphosa
- Succeeded by: Mandisi Mpahlwa

Interim Minister of Defence
- In office 25 September 2008 – 2009
- President: Kgalema Motlanthe
- Preceded by: Mosiuoa Lekota
- Succeeded by: Lindiwe Sisulu

Minister for Safety and Security
- In office 7 May 2002 – 25 September 2008
- President: Thabo Mbeki
- Preceded by: Steve Tshwete
- Succeeded by: Nathi Mthethwa

Deputy Minister of Home Affairs
- In office 24 January 2001 – 6 May 2002
- President: Thabo Mbeki

General Secretary South African Communist Party
- In office 1993–1998
- Preceded by: Chris Hani
- Succeeded by: Blade Nzimande

Personal details
- Born: 13 September 1942 (age 84) Eastern Cape, South Africa
- Party: South African Communist Party
- Other political affiliations: African National Congress
- Spouse: Nosiviwe Mapisa-Nqakula

Charles Nqakula (born 13 September 1942) is a South African politician who served as Minister of Defence from September 2008 to 2009. He also served as Minister for Safety and Security from May 2002 to September 2008.

Nqakula is married to the former Speaker of the National Assembly of South Africa, Nosiviwe Mapisa-Nqakula

On 24 June 2012, Former South African President Jacob Zuma appointed Nqakula as High Commissioner to the Republic of Mozambique.

== Early life ==
Charles Nqakula attended primary school in Cradock and secondary school in Lovedale, matriculating in 1963. He worked as a hotel waiter and wine steward, after which he became a clerk in the Department of Bantu Education.

== Journalism ==
In 1966, Nqakula started as a journalist with the Midland News, a regional weekly newspaper in Cradock. Seven years later, he became a political reporter with Imvo Zabantsundu in King William's Town. From 1976 he worked for the Daily Dispatch in East London until he was placed under an apartheid banning order in 1981. Nqakula was unbanned the following year but, because his village had been redesignated as part of the Ciskei independent homeland, he was unable to re-enter South African territory and was declared a prohibited immigrant.

He became a member of the Union of Black Journalists (UBJ) and was elected vice-president of the union in 1976. The UBJ was banned in October 1977 as part of a government crackdown on organisations supporting the Black Consciousness Movement. In 1979 he was elected vice-president of the Writers' Association of South Africa (WASA), which later became the Media Workers Association of South Africa (MWASA). Although frequently being detained by both the South African and Ciskeian authorities, he managed to establish the Veritas News Agency in Zwelitsha towards the end of 1982.

== Politics ==
Charles Nqakula was elected publicity secretary of the fledgling United Democratic Front (UDF) in 1983, and was arrested the same year in East London for being in South Africa without a visa. By this time Nqakula was an underground operative for the ANC, specialising in propaganda. He left South Africa in 1984 travelling to Lesotho, Tanzania and Zambia. He underwent military training in Angola and joined MK the armed wing of the ANC. He also travelled to the Soviet Union and East Germany for further military training.

He infiltrated South Africa on his return as one of the commanders of Operation Vula, with a mission to build viable underground and military structures. In 1988, he served as commander in the Western Cape. Emerging from the underground in 1991, he was granted amnesty by the government. He served on the interim leadership group of the SACP, as convenor of its National Organising Committee. He was also a member of its Political Committee and served on the SACP Secretariat. He was elected SACP Deputy Secretary-General in 1991 and became Secretary-General following the assassination of Chris Hani in April 1993.

Upon the demise of the apartheid government and the election of President Nelson Mandela in 1994, Nqakula was elected to the National Executive Committee of the ANC. He later served as Parliamentary Counsellor to the President. On 24 January 2001 Charles Nqakula was appointed as Deputy Minister of Home Affairs, becoming Minister of Safety and Security on 7 May 2002.

After President Thabo Mbeki was forced to resign in September 2008, Nqakula was moved to the post of Minister of Defense in the cabinet of Mbeki's successor, Kgalema Motlanthe, on 25 September 2008.

== Unfinished business ==
Following an inconclusive investigation in 1996 by the Truth and Reconciliation Commission into the 1986 aircrash in which President Samora Machel of Mozambique was killed, Charles Nqakula announced in parliament on 9 February 2006 that the inquiry is to be reopened:

"We owe it to the people of Mozambique to ensure the matter is thoroughly investigated," Nqakula said, amid lingering suspicions that the apartheid regime's Directorate of Military Intelligence caused the presidential aircraft to crash.

All of South Africa's law enforcement agencies are expected to be involved in the new inquiry, in co-operation with their Mozambican counterparts.

== Crime rate controversy ==
Later in 2006, Nqakula outraged opposition MPs in parliament (who were not satisfied that enough was being done to counter crime), when he said that "South Africans who complain about the country's crime rate, should stop whining and leave the country".

According to a United Nations Survey on Crime Trends, South Africa has the second highest murder rate in the world. South Africa also has the highest occurrence of rape in the world. Nqakula failed to realise the consequence of his statement, as many people around the world were making travel arrangements for the 2010 FIFA World Cup.

Nqakula was again criticized while he was in Burundi, promoting peace and democracy, while there was a spate of violent crime in Gauteng. This spate included the killings of an alarming number of people, including members of the South African Police Service killed while performing their duties. The criticism preceded a subsequent announcement by the minister that an all out effort would be made to quell the alarming increase of crime by 30 December 2006. 54 police officers have lost their lives in the first 7 months of 2006.

== TRC investigations ==
Family members of a number of individuals who had been murdered by the apartheid state accused leading ANC politicians, including Nqakula, of having helped suppress investigations of those murders by the Truth and Reconciliation Commission. The South African government appointed the Kampepe Commission to investigate these allegations. In his testimony before the Kampepe Commission in October 2026, Nqakula categorically denied the allegation. He said that in his youth he had been supported by the Calata family (Fort Calata's murder was one of the cases) and that anyone who suggested that he supported suppressing such investigations defiled the memory of Calata and others.

Party political offices
Preceded by Chris Hani	General Secretary of the South African Communist Party; 1993–1998	Succeeded by Blade Nzimande
Political offices
Preceded by Mosiuoa Lekota	Minister of Defence; 2008–2009	Succeeded by Lindiwe Sisulu
