= Eastern Province Command =

- Active: 1959-c. 2000
- Country: South Africa
- Type: Command
- Headquarters: Port Elizabeth

Eastern Province Command was a command of the South African Army.

== History ==
=== Origin ===
==== Under the Union Defence Force ====
In 1939, South Africa was originally divided under the Union Defence Force into 9 military districts. At the time, the command was headquartered at East London and comprised 2nd Infantry Brigade and 5 and 6 Batteries of the Permanent Garrison Artillery.

==== Districts to Commands ====
Under the SADF, Northern Transvaal Command was originally split into an eastern and western sector while Northern Cape had to be created from scratch. The Southern Cape Command was merged with Western Cape. The Officers commanding the new Commands were usually Brigadiers all units in those areas fell under them as far as training, housing, administration, discipline and counter insurgency was concerned.

==== Operations ====
In 1980, Eastern Province Command and 6 SAI engaged in Operation Rain, which was support to the Transkei during a regional drought that lasted until 1981.

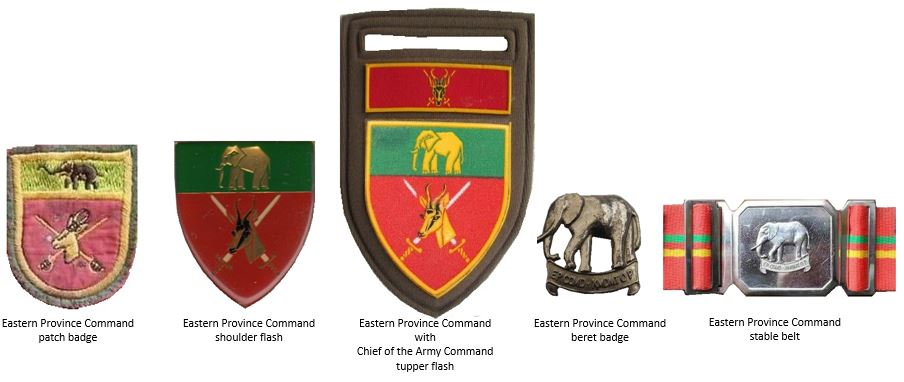
SADF era Eastern Province Command insignia

In the early 1980s the command's units were reported to include 6 South African Infantry Battalion (Grahamstown), 84 Technical Stores Depot (Grahamstown); 11 Commando (Kimberley); East Cape Province Commando (Kimberley); Port Elizabeth Commando (Kimberley); and the Danie Theron Combat School (Kimberley).

==== Under the SANDF ====
Before the reintegration of the Transkei Defence Force, a number of senior Transkei officers had undergone staff courses in India. These included the head of the Transkei Defence Force, Brigadier T.T. Matanzima, who later on became head of the Eastern Province Command.

The command was redesignated as Army Support Base Eastern Cape (ASB EC), currently commanded by Colonel N.A. Ndou. The Support Base was established in April 2000, after the closing down of the Eastern Province Command.

== Groups and Commando Units ==
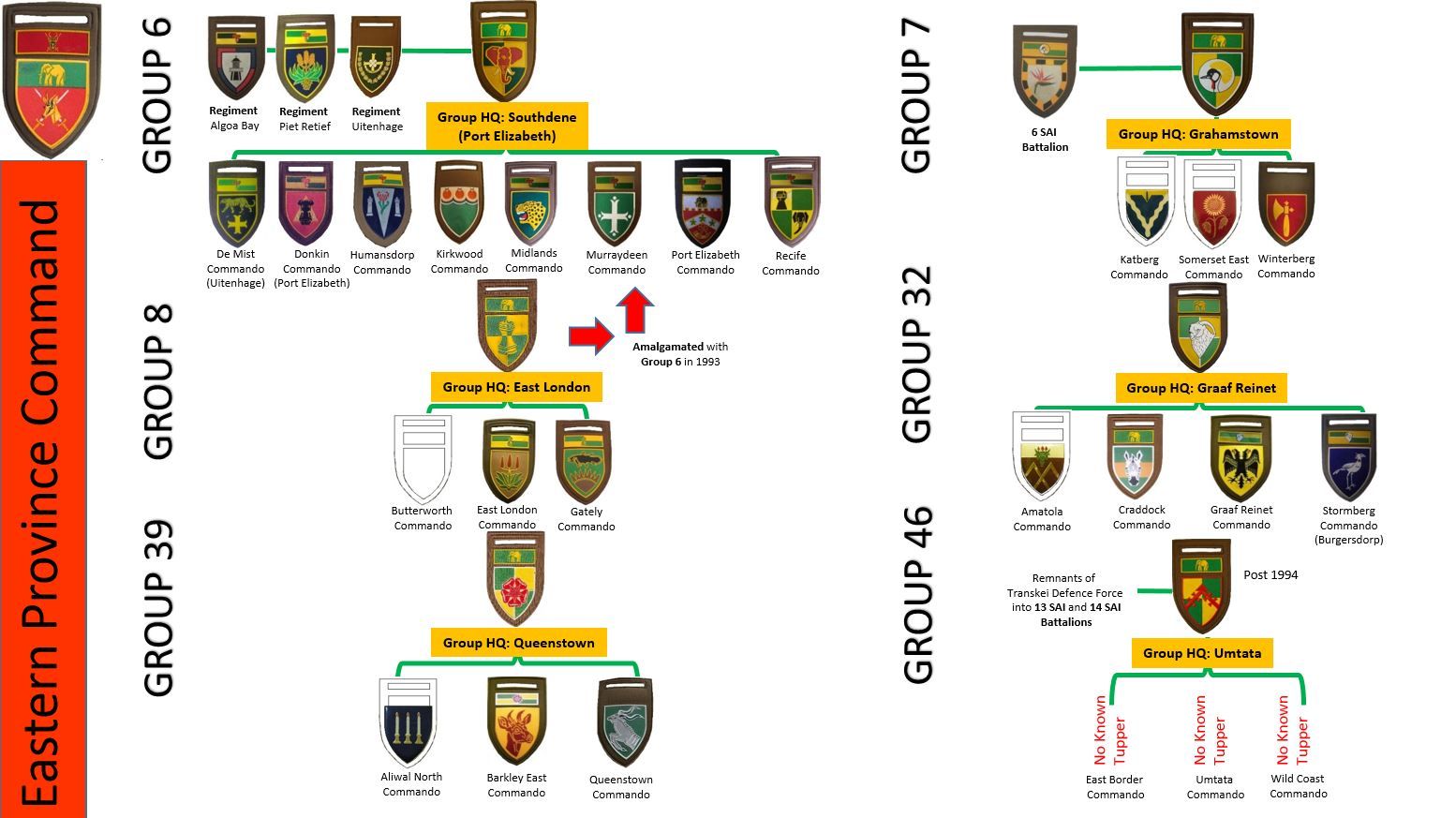
SADF era Eastern Province Command Commando structure

=== Group 6 (Port Elizabeth) ===
- De Mist Commando (Uitenhage)
- Donkin Commando
- Humansdorp Commando
- Kirkwood Commando
- Port Elizabeth Commando
- Recife Commando
- Uitenhage Commando

=== Group 7 (Grahamstown) ===
- Cradock Commando
- Katberg Commando
- Murraydeen Commando
- Somerset East Commando
- Stormberg Commando

=== Group 8 (East London) ===
- Cately Commando
- East London Commando

=== Group 32 (Graaff-Reinet) ===
- Amatola Commando
- Graaff-Reinet Commando

=== Group 39 (Queenstown) ===
- Aliwal North Commando
- Barkly East Commando
- Queenstown Commando

== Leadership ==
Eastern Province Command
| From | Commanding Officers | To | Ribbon |
|---|---|---|---|
| 1968 | Brig Jack Dutton SSAS,SD,SM,MMM (Note: Later Lieutenant General) (Note: Later Chief of Staff Operations) | 1973 | Star of South Africa SSAS Southern Cross Decoration SD Southern Cross Medal SM Military Merit Medal MMM |
| 1 January 1983 | Brig Joffel van der Westhuizen SD,SM,MMM | January 1987 | Southern Cross Decoration SD Southern Cross Medal SM Military Merit Medal MMM |
| January 1987 | Brig Wessel Kritzinger SD,SM,MMM (Note: Later GOC Witwatersrand Command; Later Chief of Staff Operations) | March 1990 | Southern Cross Decoration SD Southern Cross Medal SM Military Merit Medal MMM |
| April 1990 | Brig Toon Slabbert | April 1996 | |
| 1996 | Maj Gen Themba Matanzima CCM,SM,MMM | n.d. | Commander Class Medal CCM Southern Cross Medal SM Military Merit Medal MMM |

== See also ==
South African Army Order of Battle 1940
