= 1946 New Year Honours (South Africa) =

The 1946 New Year Honours were appointments by many of the Commonwealth Realms of King George VI to various orders and honours to reward and highlight good works by citizens of those countries, and to celebrate the passing of 1945 and the beginning of 1946. They were announced on 1 January 1946 for the United Kingdom, and Dominions, Canada, the Union of South Africa, and New Zealand.

The recipients of honours are displayed here as they were styled before their new honour, and arranged by honour, with classes (Knight, Knight Grand Cross, etc.) and then divisions (Military, Civil, etc.) as appropriate.

== Union of South Africa ==
=== Order of the Bath ===
==== Companion of the Order of the Bath (CB) ====
Military Division

- Brigadier Pieter de Waal, CBE, (P.179910V) South African Staff Corps (V).

=== Order of the British Empire ===
==== Commander of the Order of the British Empire (CBE) ====
Military Division

- Temporary Commodore (2nd Class) James Dalgleish, OBE, (P.70003V), South African Naval Forces (V).
- Colonel Frederick Collins, OBE, MC, (89428V), South African Staff Corps (V).
- Colonel George Harry Cotton, OBE, ED, (179957V), South African Staff Corps (V).
- Brigadier Johann Bosman Kriegler (279373V), South African Staff Corps (V).
- Colonel Ronald Campbell Ross, DSO, OBE, (240371V), South African Staff Corps (V).
- Colonel William Thomas Beaumont Tasker (P.102579V), South African Air Force.

==== Officer of the Order of the British Empire (OBE) ====
Military Division

- Colonel Thomas Bailey Clapham, MC, (86960V), South African Staff Corps (V).
- Chaplain (3rd Class) (acting Chaplain, 2nd Class) Arie Gerhardus Oberholster Coertse (P.86780V), General Services Corps (V) (Chaplains).
- Lieutenant-Colonel David Barrable Hodges (255294V) Special Signals Services, South African Corps of Signals.
- Lieutenant-Colonel Herbert Sheridan Mockford (223517V), General Services Corps, Non-European Army Services.
- Temporary Colonel Henry Alford Moffat, DSO, (253698V), South African Medical Corps.
- Colonel Hendrik Johannes Zinn (P.87384V), South African Staff Corps (V).
- Acting Colonel Jacobus Adriaan De Vos (P.102589V), South African Air Force.
- Major Silas Machin Coxon (P.188V), South African Air Force.

==== Member of the Order of the British Empire (MBE) ====
Military Division

South African Army

- Lieutenant-Colonel John Gamble Knox Agnew (130644V), "Q" Services Corps.
- Lieutenant John Brook (34218V), South African Engineers Corps.
- Temporary Major Alice Cox (W.312306V), Women's Auxiliary Army Services, attached South African Medical Corps.
- Major (temporary Lieutenant-Colonel) John Findlay Davidson (302737), South African Medical Corp. Attached Union Defence Force Repatriation Unit.
- Major Francis Dawson (133157), South African Staff Corps (V).
- Lieutenant-Colonel Edgar Francis Edwards (P.240461V), Technical Services Corps.
- Temporary Warrant Officer (Class I) Harold William Harris (179886VE), General Services Corps (V).
- Captain William Fred Hobbs (85909V), General Services Corps (V).
- Temporary Captain George William Ings (170506V), South African Engineers Corps.
- Captain (Acting Major) Alexander Leopold Kowarsky (78405V), General Services Corps (V).
- Temporary Captain Johanna Aletta Mentz (W.153175V), Women's Auxiliary Army Services.
- Captain Bernard Notcutt (25217V), Army Educational Services (V).
- Temporary Lieutenant (Acting Major) Ralph Ackerman Polkinghorne (323000V), General Services Corps (V).
- Temporary Captain Ernest Samuel Pearson Shirley (213542V), Railways and Harbours Brigade.
- Major Robert Miller Strachan (179925V), South African Pay Corps.
- Major Harold Evelyn Watts (45416V), South African Army Postal Corps.
- Major John Nicol Williamson (36212V), South African Intelligence Corps.
- Temporary Chaplain 3rd Class Hugh Falconer Yule (1277487), General Services Corps (V) (Chaplains Dept.) Attached U.D.F. Repatriation Unit.
- Major Eric Sydney Evans (186611V), South African Forces.

South African Air Force

- Major John Blamire (103019V).
- Major Arthur Dallas Coetzee (203041V).
- Major Oscar Egenes (203023V).
- Major Allan Hildred Fish (202882V).
- Major Muriel Agatha Horrell (F.46625V), South African Women's Auxiliary Air Force.
- Major James Ireland-Low (102871V).
- Temporary Major Harold Cartwright Robinson (2511407).
- Captain Vernon Percival Field (478237).
- Captain Neville Colin Edward Wimble (P.108V).
- Temporary Captain Sylvia Gordon Sprigg (F.2663587), South African Women's Auxiliary Air Force.
- Lieutenant Victor Tetlow Kilburn (P.48437).
- Temporary Warrant Officer Class II, Adram Kesler (969447).

=== British Empire Medal (BEM) ===
Military Division

South African Naval Forces

- (J.25513) Chief Petty Officer Thomas Vincent.
- (6157117) Chief Petty Officer Swan Margaret Olive Forbes.

South African Army

- 1428077 Temporary Sergeant Paul Johannes Bunce, South African Army Postal Corps. Attached U.D.F. Repatriation Unit.
- 206538VE Temporary Sergeant Thomas Rolande Claude Worthington-Cooper, South African Veterinary Corps.
- 13052181 Sergeant Harold Victor Counsell, Armoured Corps Commando. Attached U.D.F. Repatriation Unit (Ex-P.W.).
- 11068V Staff Sergeant Melville Ivanhoe Fisher, South African Pay Corps. Attached U.D.F. Repatriation Unit.
- W.154207V Staff Sergeant Martha Helena Geldard, Women's Auxiliary Army Service. Attached Entertainment Unit.
- 579V Temporary Staff Sergeant Hugh Thomson Rose-Innes, "Q" Services Corps.
- 58871V Staff Sergeant Alfred James Martin, General Services Corps (Non-European Army Services).
- W.57338 Corporal Alfrede Cicely Mateer, Women's Auxiliary Army Services. Attached "Q" Services Corps (Supplies).
- 76126V Temporary Corporal Albert Reitz, General Services Corps (V). Attached U.D.F. Repatriation Unit.
- SR.5986257 Temporary Staff Sergeant Alexander Elios Slutzkin, General Services Corps (V). Attached U.D.F. Repatriation Unit.
- 22906V Temporary Sergeant Louis George Stanbridge, South African Medical Corps. Attached U.D.F. Repatriation Unit.
- SR.598681V Temporary Staff Sergeant Reginald Nelson Tomlinson, General Services Corps (V). Attached U.D.F. Repatriation Unit.
- 185981V Staff Sergeant Raymond Ward, "Q" Services Corps (Motor Transport).

South African Air Force

- 47263V Flight Sergeant Henry Daniel Ferguson.
- F.264697V Flight Sergeant Rose Fowles, South African Women's Auxiliary Air Force.
- F.46752V Temporary Flight Sergeant Margaret Duncan, South African Women's Auxiliary Air Force.
- 208345V Temporary Flight Sergeant Leslie John Francis.
- F.265312V Temporary Flight Sergeant Myra Hines, South African Women's Auxiliary Air Force.
- 312983V Temporary Flight Sergeant Edgar Alexander Howarth.
- 577266V Temporary Flight Sergeant Ian Ernest Hope-Jones.
- 98891V Temporary Flight Sergeant Phillip Butler Bernard Promnitz.
- 312511V Sergeant Benoni Joubert.
- 110484 Corporal Reginald Kennedy Silver Chandler.
- F.268833 Temporary Air Corporal Margaretha Gertraida Sophia Olivier, South African Women's Auxiliary Air Force.
- 572220 Air Mechanic Michael Josias de Kock.

=== Royal Red Cross (RRC) ===
- Nursing Sister Frances Edith Melkman (317098V), South African Military Nursing Services.

==== Associate of the Royal Red Cross (ARRC) ====
- Nursing Sister Daphne Maureen Gibson (254705V), South African Military Nursing Services.
- Nursing Sister Edith Marjorie Hutton (254324V), South African Military Nursing Services.
- Nursing Sister Elizabeth Gordon Putnam (308180V), South African Military Nursing Services.

=== Air Force Cross (AFC) ===
South African Air Force

- Lieutenant-Colonel Francis Louis Kotze (203107V).
- Temporary Lieutenant-Colonel Clifford Stewart Coppen, DFC, (203158V).
- Temporary Lieutenant-Colonel Jacobus Gerhard Joubert Krige (102672V).
- Major James Adam (102915V).
- Temporary Major Edwin Keith Dunning (202880V).
- Captain Gustav Friedrich Behn (102801V).
- Captain Herbert Collishaw Boyden (47408V).
- Captain George Grant Duncan (1O2991V).
- Captain Anthony Dennis Michael Lawrenson (47842V).
- Captain Solomon Pienaar, DFC, (102855V).
- Captain Ronald Francis Roberts (103176V).
- Captain Pieter de Wet, DFC, (1O2658V).
- Lieutenant Walter Gordon Croxford, (103638V).
- Lieutenant James Louis Siddle (2O5506V).

=== Air Force Medal (AFM) ===
South African Air Force

- 95083V Temporary Air Sergeant Gerhardus Martinus Benade.
- 97353V Temporary Air Sergeant Neill O'Doherty Hugh Robson-Garth.
- 99795V Temporary Air Sergeant Milon James Killassy.
