= Nelson Mandela Regiment =

Regiment Piet Retief Regiment Transkei Regiment Noordoos-Kaap Regiment Piet Retief Nelson Mandela Regiment
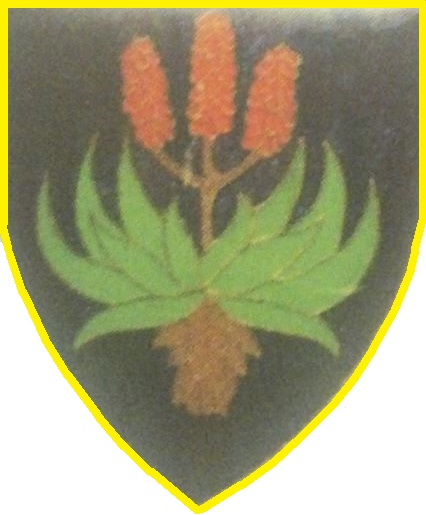
- SANDF Regiment Piet Retief emblem SANDF Regiment Piet Retief emblem
- Active: 1 January 1964 to present
- Country: South Africa
- Allegiance: Republic of South Africa; Republic of South Africa
- Branch: South African Army; South African Army
- Type: Infantry
- Role: Light infantry
- Size: One battalion
- Part of: South African Infantry Formation; Army Conventional Reserve
- Garrison/HQ: Port Elizabeth Humewood, Algoa Military Base
- Motto: Ad Mortem (Til Death)

Commanders
- Current commander: Lt Col T.T. Ndengane
- Honorary Colonel: To be appointed

Insignia
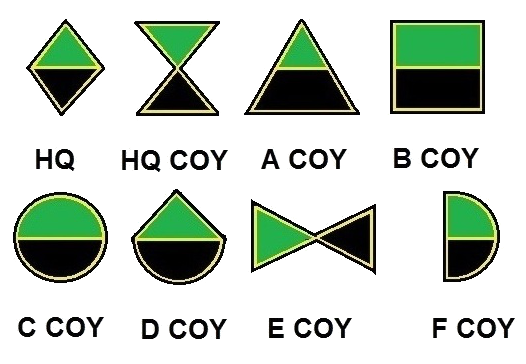
- Company level Insignia

- SA Motorised Infantry beret bar circa 1992: SA Motorised Infantry beret bar
- Abbreviation: NMR

The Nelson Mandela Regiment (formerly Regiment Piet Retief) is a reserve infantry regiment of the South African Army.

== History ==
=== Under the Union Defence Force ===
==== World War 2 Mobilisation ====
The regiment was founded on 1 February 1940 as a citizen force infantry unit and named the Regiment Piet Retief, with the main purpose to supply troops for the Second World War. On 16 March 1940, the regiment was reorganized as an artillery unit renamed the 5th Field Regiment, South African Artillery taking part in the Second World War as such.

==== Post World War ====
After the Second World War, the 5th Field became virtually non existent, however some years later the remnants of the regiment was renamed to Regiment Algoa Bay, of which its Uitenhage company became known as Regiment Uitenhage at a later stage.

==== Rebirth of Regiment Piet Retief ====
On 1 January 1954, Regiment Piet Retief was re-established as a predominantly Afrikaans speaking motorized infantry citizen force regiment with its headquarters in Graaff-Reinet. In 1956 the HQ moved to Cradock and in 1962 it moved to the Drill Hall in Queenstown. During 1987 the HQ moved to Port Elizabeth, where it is still based.

=== Under the SADF ===
==== Numerous Name changes ====
In 1960 the regiment's name was changed to Regiment Transkei (RTK), but by 1966, this was changed to Regiment Noordoos-Kaap (RNOK) and by 1 April 1967 the name was again changed back to Regiment Piet Retief (RPR).

==== Colours ====
On 22 November 1969, the regiment received its Regimental Colours and changed its role to that of an infantry CO.IN(counter insurgency) unit.

On 19 May 1990 the unit received its National Colour, which was laid up at the Group 39 chapel in Queenstown in 1995.

=== Under the SANDF ===
==== Command ====
On 11 November 1994, the regiment was placed under command of Group 39 in Queenstown, after being under command of Group 6 in Port Elizabeth for a number of years.

On 1 April 1997 the regiment was again placed under command of Group 6, after the closure of Group 39.

==== Amalgamation ====
During the latter part of 2000, Regiment Algoa Bay, Regiment Uitenhage and Donkin Regiment were amalgamated with Regiment Piet Retief. A new command team was appointed by the Infantry Formation. Regiment Piet Retief was then placed directly under command of the Infantry Formation.

==== Name change ====
In August 2019, 52 Reserve Force units had their names changed to reflect the diverse military history of South Africa. Regiment Piet Retief became the Nelson Mandela Regiment (in memory of the late President of South Africa), and have 3 years to design and implement new regimental insignia.

==== Current Command ====
- Honorary Colonel: To be appointed
- Officer Commanding: Lt Col T.T. Ndengane
- Second in Command: Maj V.N. Tukulu
- RSM: MWO V. Njozela

== Leadership ==
Leadership
From	Honorary Colonel	To	Ribbon
N/A	To be appointed	Present	
From	Commanding Officers	To	Ribbon
1 January 1954	Cmdt M.G. Botha	31 December 1959	
1 January 1960	Cmdt D.J. Schoeman	30 June 1963	
1 July 1963	Cmdt F.Z. Kruger	28 December 1964	
29 December 1964	Maj J.W. Conradie	22 March 1965	
23 March 1965	*(acting Officer Commanding) Cmdt J.W. Conradie	27 August 1967	
28 August 1967	Cmdt D.H. Malan	27 May 1978	
28 May 1978	Maj R.A. van den Berg	27 May 1979	
10 August 1979	*Maj J.H. van der Vyver	23 February 1980	
20 October 1980	Cmdt J.H. van der Vyver	30 June 1982	
1 July 1982	Maj F.H. Human	13 August 1982	
14 August 1982	*Cmdt F.H. Human	31 July 1994	
1 August 1994	Lt Col E. van Niekerk MMM,JCD	31 October 2005	Military Merit Medal MMM John Chard Decoration JCD
1 November 2005	Lt Col T.P. Swanepoel JCD	31 May 2012	
1 November 2012	Lt Col V.P. Mbali	31 December 2019	
1 November 2021	Lt Col S.S. Singunza	25 April 2024	
25 April 2024	Lt Col T.T. Ndengane	Present	
From	Regimental Sergeants Major	To	Ribbon
01 December	MWO A.M. Xokolo	31 December 2017	
01 January 2023	MWO V. Njozela	Present	

=== Regimental emblems ===
==== Badge ====
The regiments emblem depicts an Aloe (Aloe Ferox) in bloom with the motto "AD MORTEM" (till death) on the scroll beneath it. Ferox is a Latin adjective meaning brave, courageous and combative, which is a fitting to an aloe, due to the difficult circumstances under which it normally has to grow and fitting to true infantrymen, due to the difficult circumstances under which they sometimes have to operate.

=== Dress ===
The Regiment's leader group used to wear their infantry lanyards around the right shoulder with dress number 1 and 4, because of the Regiments historical connection with the artillery, namely the 5th Field Regiment. The current leadership felt it necessary to align itself with the current dress code and regulations and changed the lanyard to the left as the rest of the Infantry Formation.

The Regiment has its own unique mess dress with an orange jacket, depicting the colour of the flowers of its emblem, as well as the regiment's strong roots in the Eastern Cape, where orange is a traditional colour used widely by many of the Xhosa tribes.

The regiment also has its own blue blazer, and matching tie, with an aloe in full colour on the blazer pocket badge for all unit members. A black blazer, with a silver wire aloe emblem on the pocket badge, and matching tie, is worn by Regiment members with John Chard Medals, or 10 years or more Loyal Service medals. A black blazer, with a gold wire aloe emblem on the pocket badge, and matching tie, is worn by Regiment members with John Chard Decorations, or 20 years or more Loyal Service medals.

The Regiment also has an informal attire consisting of a golf shirt, padded or fleece jacket, jersey, shorts, cap and track suit all with the regiment's emblem on it.

=== Toast ===
The regiment toasts with aloe juice. When members are promoted, they are congratulated to their new rank or appointment by being expected to have a drink of aloe juice, after which they say the unit motto "AD MORTEM" aloud.

=== Battle cry ===
In order to motivate the regiments soldiers as Infanteers, the regiment has its own unique "Battle Cry" that also promotes the regiments and Infantry ethos.

=== Song ===
The regiment encouraged members to compose a song that would identify them and their uniqueness from the Eastern Cape, including the long road the regiment has travelled in protecting the countries citizens as a force multiplier to the Regular Force.

== Regimental Symbols ==
The units emblem is the tough Aloe plant, for which the Eastern Cape is known.

=== Previous Dress Insignia ===
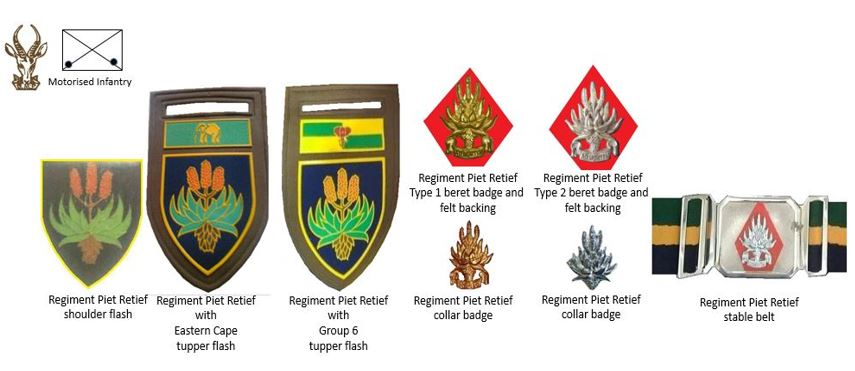
SADF era Regiment Piet Retief insignia

=== Current Dress Insignia ===
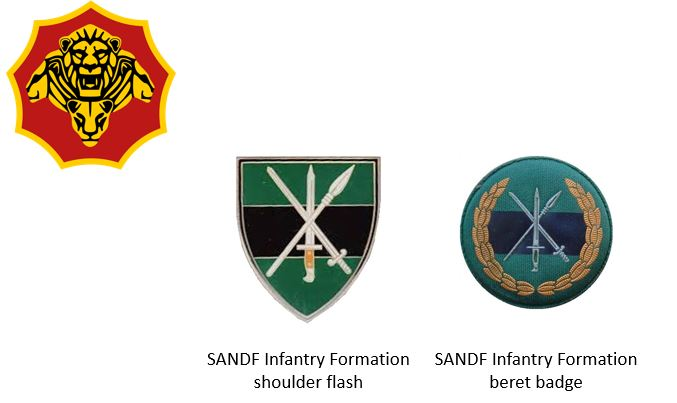
SANDF era Infantry Formation insignia
