= 2nd South African Infantry Brigade =

- Active: 13 Aug 1940 – 1 Jan 1943
- Disbanded: 1 January 1943
- Country: South Africa
- Allegiance: Union of South Africa
- Branch: South African Army
- Type: Infantry
- Size: Brigade

Commanders
- Commander October 1942: Brig. W.H.E. Poole CB CBE DSO (Note: CB, CBE, DSO, Commander of the US Legion of Merit, Commander of the French Légion d'honneur, Croix de Guerre avec Palme, Mentioned in Despatches)

The 2nd South African Infantry Brigade was an infantry brigade of the army of the Union of South Africa during World War II. The Brigade formed part of the 1st South African Infantry Division and was formed on 13 August 1940. It served in East Africa and the Western Desert and was disbanded on 1 January 1943.

In September 1939 Niehorster lists the brigade as being part of Eastern Province Command.

In the East African Campaign, the Brigade was led by Brigadier F.L.A. Buchanan and consisted of:

- 1st Natal Mounted Rifles
- 1st Field Force Battalion
- 2nd Field Force Battalion
- No. 2 S.A. Armoured Car Company
- 12th Field Company, SA Corps of Engineers
- 12th Field Ambulance, SA Medical Corps
- No. 2 Mobile General Workshops, SA Technical Services Corps
- 3 Brigade Signals Company, SA Corps of Signals

During the Western Desert Campaign (at the time of the Second Battle of El Alamein), the Officer Commanding was Brig. W.H.E. Poole and the brigade comprised the following units:

- 1st Cape Town Highlanders SA Infantry Corps
- 1st Natal Mounted Rifles SA Infantry Corps
- 1st Field Force Battalion SA Infantry Corps
- 2nd Field Force Battalion SA Infantry Corps
- B Company (Machine Gun), Die Middelandse Regiment SA Infantry Corps
- 4th Company (Machine Gun), Regiment President Steyn SA Infantry Corps
- 1st and 2nd Anti-Tank Batteries SA Artillery Corps
- 3rd Light Anti-Aircraft Battery (less two Troops) SA Artillery Corps
- 1st, 3rd and 14th Field Batteries of 1st Field Regt SA Artillery Corps

== Bibliography ==
- Orpen, Neil D. (1975). Victory in Italy. South African Forces: World War II. Vol. V. Cape Town: Purnell. ISBN 0-360-00282-X.
