= Guy Hallifax =

Royal Navy and South African Navy officer

Rear-Admiral Guy Hallifax CMG
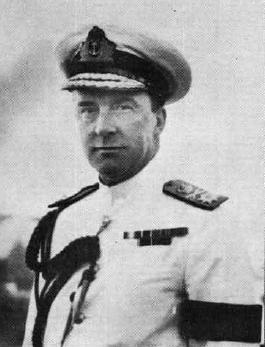
- Born: 21 June 1884; South Stoneham, Hampshire, England
- Died: 28 March 1941 (aged 56); Baboon Point, 74 km north of Saldanha, Western Cape 32°19′0.00″S 18°19′0.00″E
- Burial place: Plumstead Cemetery
- Military career
- Branch: Royal Navy
- Rank: Rear-Admiral
- Awards: Order of St Michael and St George CMG Order of Saints Maurice and Lazarus Order of the Medjidie

Rear-Admiral Guy Waterhouse Hallifax CMG (21 June 1884 – 28 March 1941) was a Royal Navy officer who was recruited by the South African government to organise a navy.

== Naval career ==
Hallifax joined HMS Britannia in 1899 and served as a Naval Advisor in Turkey, for which he was awarded the Order of the Medjideh (3rd class). During the First World War served as first lieutenant and torpedo lieutenant on board HMS Ajax. After being attached to the Inter-Allied Commission in Berlin he served in HMS Valiant, Home Fleet, from 1921 to 1923. He then attended various disarmament meetings at Geneva and was promoted captain in 1924. Two years later he commanded the cruiser HMS Carlisle, of the China Squadron, remaining there until 1928. He was later appointed naval attaché in Paris and also served in that capacity in Madrid, Brussels and The Hague. He returned to active naval duties when he was appointed to command of HMS Malaya from 1932 to 1934. In 1935 he became Director of the Signal Division of the Admiralty, and was promoted Rear-Admiral, retired, in the same year.

Rear-Admiral Hallifax went out to South Africa as secretary to Lord Clarendon, who was then Governor-General in South Africa, in 1936, and continued in this capacity for the first four months of the governor-generalship of Sir Patrick Duncan. On the outbreak of World War II in 1939, he was recruited by the South African government to organise a navy, which was named the Seaward Defence Force.

== South African Navy ==
As Director of the Seaward Defence Force, he established a small fleet of minesweepers and anti-submarine vessels for coastal defence, and organised naval detachments in the major ports. On the 15 January 1940, the new Seaward Defence Force (SDF) took over responsibility for naval defence from the Royal Navy. Cdr James Dalgleish was appointed as commander of one of the newly formed Port Divisions (later renamed detachments). Dalgleish was soon thereafter to rise to command the SDF on the death of Hallifax.

== Promotions ==
- Confirmed in the rank of Sub-Lieutenant 15 July 1903.
- Sub-Lieutenant to Lieutenant 15 January 1905.
- Commander to Captain 30 June 1924.
- Captain to Rear-Admiral 3 October 1935.
- Placed on the Retired List 4 October 1935.

== Death ==
He was killed on the 28 March 1941 in an aeroplane crash at Baboon Point, 74 kilometres (46 mi) north of Saldanha while returning from a tour of inspection to the newly established naval detachment in Walvis Bay.

== Awards ==
- Order of St Michael and St George (Companion) (CMG) (Great Britain)
- Order of Saints Maurice and Lazarus (Commander) (Italy)
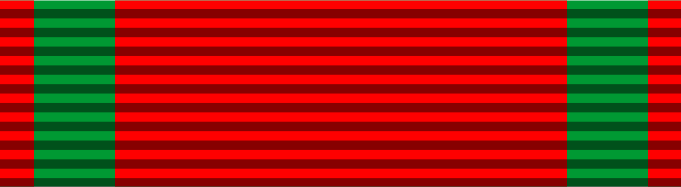
- Order of the Medjidie (Ottoman Empire)

== See also ==
- List of South African military chiefs
- South African Navy

Military offices
| New title | Director, South African Naval Forces; 1940–1941 | Succeeded by James Dalgleish |
