= Danie Theron Combat School =

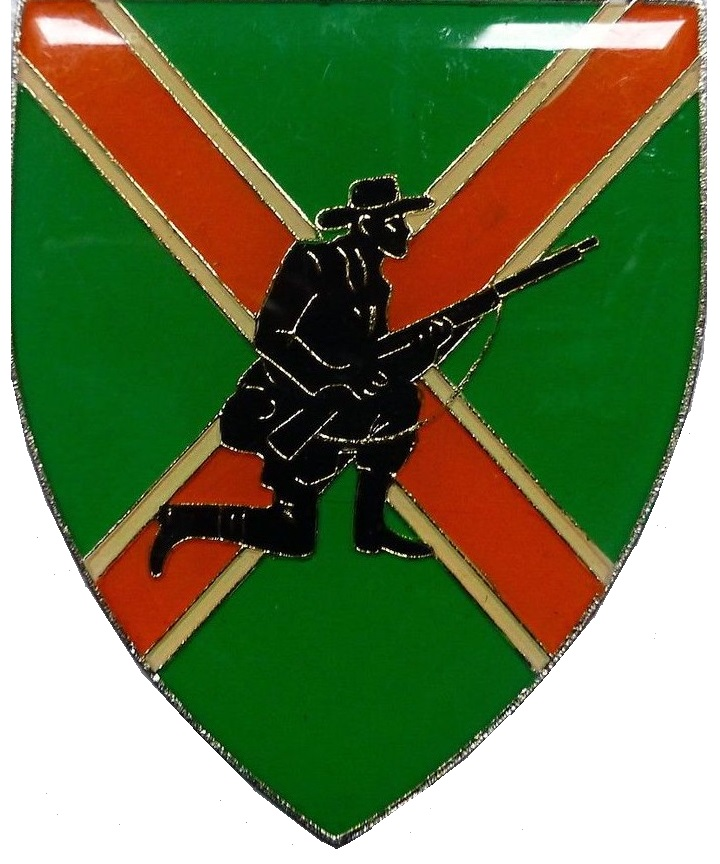
- Danie Theron Combat School
- Active: 1967 (59 years ago)–1982 (44 years ago)
- Country: Republic of South Africa
- Allegiance: Republic of South Africa
- Branch: South African Army
- Type: Infantry Training Centre
- Role: Light Infantry
- Size: One Battalion
- Part of: South African Infantry Corps; Army Territorial Reserve
- Garrison/HQ: Diskolobos, Kimberley

Danie Theron Combat School was a light infantry training regiment of the South African Army. It formed part of the South African Army Infantry Formation as well as the South African Territorial Reserve.

== History ==
=== Origin ===
Danie Theron Combat School was established near Kimberley around 1967, aimed at primary infantry training for the Commando system. The school was initially called the Commando Combat School, but by 1968 was renamed in honour of Danie Theron, a renowned Boer war soldier.

=== Operations ===
The School was initially responsible for basic military training. The majority of the recruits were area bound farmers, business owners, or essentials services). These recruits were to be allocated to regional commandos after their initial training.

The school was also responsible for promotional training of Civilian Force officers and non-commissioned officers.

Other training modules include conventional and rural counter insurgency training.

By 1973, the majority of the Danie Theron Combat School training/recruit wing staff were transferred to a new unit 11 Commando (South African).

Promotional and Corp specific Training was eventually transferred to other Infantry schools by the mid 1980s.

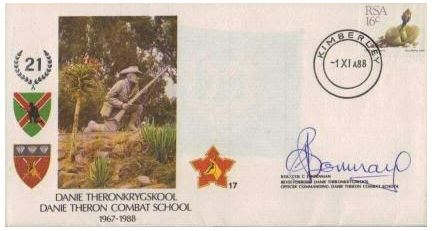
SADF era Danie Theron Combat School Commemorative letter

== Unit Insignia ==
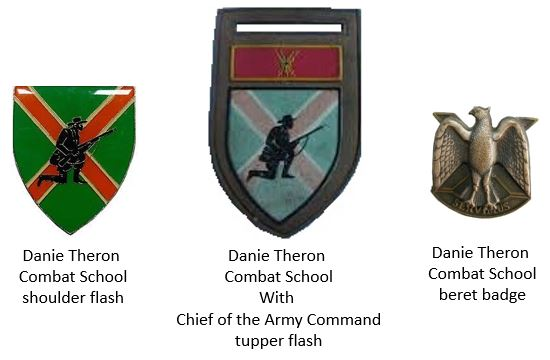
SADF era Danie Theron Combat School insignia

== Leadership ==
Leadership
From	Honorary Colonel	To	Ribbon
	No known incumbents		
From	Officer Commanding	To	Ribbon
1967	Col J. Fourie	c. 1969	
1969	Col P.E.K. Bosman	c. 1973	
1973	Col B. Redlinghuys	c. 1974	
1974	Col H.F.P. Riekert	c. 1976	
1976	Col J.S. van Heerden	c. 1978	
1978	Col M. Faul	c. 1980	
1980	Col G.C.M.G. Fourie	c. 1982	
1982	Col J.L. Jordaan	c. 1985	
1985	Col C.J. Bornman	c. 1994	
From	Regimental Sergeant Major	To	Ribbon
c. 1967	WO1 G.C. Heyns	c. 1975	
1975	WO2 J. Matthews	c. 1975	
1975	WO1 J.H. Burger	c. 1977	
1978	WO1 J.L. Scherman	c. 1982	
1983	WO1 J.F. Somers	c. 1986	
1986	WO1 H.A. Westraadt	c. nd	

== See also ==
- South African Commando System
