= Regiment Algoa Bay =

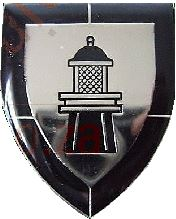
- Regiment Algoa Bay emblem
- Active: 1946
- Allegiance: Republic of South Africa; South Africa
- Branch: South African Army
- Size: Battalion
- Part of: South African Infantry Corps; Army Conventional Reserve
- Garrison/HQ: Port Elizabeth
- Motto(s): A Outrance
- Battle honours

Regiment Algoa Bay was an infantry battalion of the South African Army. As a reserve force unit, it had a status roughly equivalent to that of a British Army Reserve or United States Army National Guard unit.

== History ==
=== Artillery origins ===
Regiment Algoa Bay was raised in January 1946 in Port Elizabeth. The Regiment was initially intended as an artillery unit to be known as the 5th Field Regiment. The Regiment therefore initially wore artillery badges.

=== Role and Name changes ===
By January 1960 however, the Regiment was renamed Regiment Algoa Bay and its role changed to that of mechanized infantry. The lighthouse cap badge was adopted in 1964 and was based on the design of the Donkin Reserve lighthouse.

=== Amalgamation ===
During the latter part of 2000, Regiment Algoa Bay, Regiment Uitenhage and Donkin Regiment were amalgamated with Regiment Piet Retief. A new command team was appointed by a selection board that was convened by the Infantry Formation. Regiment Piet Retief was then also placed directly under command of the Infantry Formation.

== Regimental emblems ==
=== Dress Insignia ===
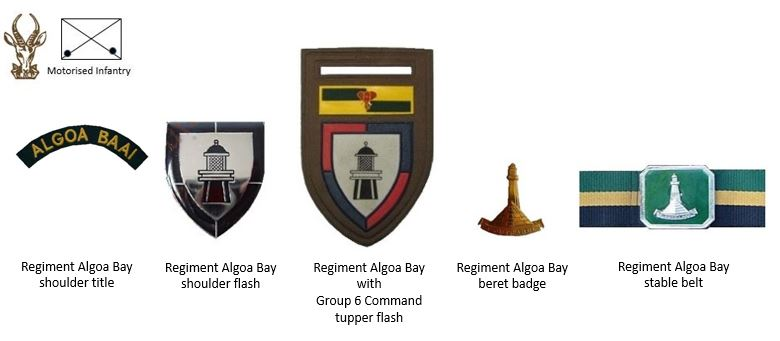
SADF era Regiment Algoa Bay insignia
