= Frederick Dean (SA Navy) =

South African military commander (1900–1983)

Commodore Frederick John Dean OBE
- Born: 1 September 1900
- Died: 13 October 1983 (aged 83)
- Military career
- Branch: South African Navy
- Commands: South African Navy; HMSAS Southern Barrier
- Conflicts: World War I; World War II
- Awards: Order of the British Empire OBE

Commodore Frederick Dean (1900–1983) was a South African military commander.

== Military career ==
During World War I, he served with the Mercantile Marine, attached to the Royal Navy. He became a sub-lieutenant in the RNR and served in submarines. He joined the South African arm of the RNVR as a lieutenant.

In 1940, he became Officer Commanding of HMSAS Southern Barrier, sweeping the Agulhas Bank, which earned him an OBE.

From 1942, he was Commanding Officer, Cape Town Detachment, Seaward Defence Force.

In 1945, he became Commander Seaward Defences, South African Naval Forces, effectively the head of the South African Navy.

== Later career ==
He was a trustee of the National War Museum from 1946 to 1952.

== Awards and decorations ==
- Order of the British Empire (OBE)

== See also ==
- List of South African military chiefs
- South African Navy

Military offices
| Preceded by James Dalgleish | Director, South African Naval Forces; 1946 – 1951 | Next: Pieter de Waal |
