= Evered Poole =

Major General William Henry Evered Poole CB CBE DSO KStJ LOM (USA)
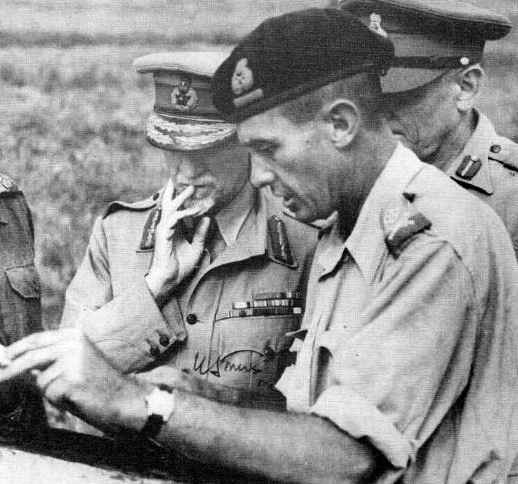
- General Poole with Field Marshal Jan Smuts in June 1944
- Born: 8 October 1902; Caledon, Cape Colony
- Died: 9 March 1969 (aged 66); Bellville, Cape Province
- Spouses: Elsie Irene van Boescoten (m. 1927; div. 1951) Maureen Naish-Gray (m. 1951)
- Military career
- Allegiance: South Africa
- Branch: South African Army
- Service years: 1920–1951
- Rank: Major General
- Service number: 254101V
- Commands: Deputy Chief of General Staff; 6th South African Armoured Division; Cape Fortress; 2nd Infantry Brigade; South African Military College; Special Service Battalion
- Conflicts: Second World War; Second Battle of El Alamein; Battle of Monte Cassino
- Awards: Order of the Bath CB Order of the British Empire CBE Distinguished Service Order DSO Venerable Order of Saint John KStJ 1939–45 Star Africa Star Italy Star War Medal 1939 – 1945 MID Africa Service Medal (WWII) Legion of Merit LOM Légion d'honneur
- Other work: Diplomat

Major General William Henry Evered Poole, CB, CBE, DSO, KStJ, LOM (USA) (8 October 1902 – 9 March 1969) was a senior South African Army commander during the Second World War and later a diplomat.

== Early life ==
William Henry Evered Poole was born in Caledon, Cape Colony on 8 October 1902. He was the son of Major William John Evered Poole, previously of the 60th King's Royal Rifle Corps, and Constance van Breda, a member of one of the best-known Cape Colony families, who had married in October the previous year. As the first-born son, he was given Evered as his last name in accordance with age-old Poole tradition.

Poole attended an Anglican private boys' school, St Andrew's College in Grahamstown, from 1911 to 1917 and the Diocesan College, informally known as "Bishops", Rondebosch in 1918.

In 1927, Poole married Elsie Irene van Boeschoten and had one daughter. After the dissolution of the marriage in 1951, he married Maureen Naish-Gray on 22 October 1951.

== Military career ==
=== Regimental service and peacetime commands ===
In 1920, while a public servant, Poole joined the 9th Infantry Regiment (Cape Peninsula Rifles) of the Active Citizen Force as a private.

Poole transferred to the Permanent Force in 1922. He was placed first on the course for promotion to commissioned rank on 11 September 1923. He was next posted as a lieutenant to the 3rd Battery, South African Field Artillery and transferred to the South African Permanent Garrison Artillery at Cape Town in March 1925, when he again qualified in the first place on a garrison gunnery course. In 1927, he attended a staff duties course at the South African Military College at Roberts Heights and was attached to the South African staff Corps at the college in 1929, again passing out in the first place on a staff duties course of the Permanent Force in 1931. Appointed officer instructor to the Transvaal Horse Artillery for 1931 – 32, he qualified as a captain in the Field Artillery at the end of 1931. In June 1932, he was granted the temporary rank of captain as staff officer, 'A' and 'G', in Cape Town and transferred to the staff corps.

Poole was subsequently posted to the Special Service Battalion as second-in-command with the rank of major. He became the officer commanding of the battalion in February 1934. In June 1935, he was granted the temporary rank of lieutenant colonel and was attached to the British Brigade of Guards at Aldershot, in London, and at Pirbright until September 1935. For the rest of the year, he attended the Senior Officers' School at Sheerness. He returned to South Africa to resume command of the Special Service Battalion in 1936.

In October 1937, Poole was transferred to the South African Military College and became commandant of the college on 16 March 1938. Following the Union's entry into the Second World War in September 1939, Poole organised the greatly expanded facilities at the college, including the huge 'B' Mess dining halls seating 500 officer cadets.

=== Second World War ===
Poole was appointed General Service Officer Grade 1 (GSO1) of 1st South African Infantry Division, with the rank of colonel, on its formation in August 1940. However, when the 2nd South African Infantry Division was formed he became its GSO1 on 1 October 1940.

In April 1941, Poole was promoted to the temporary rank of brigadier. In June, he was transferred back to the 1st Division as brigadier to take command of the 2nd South African Infantry Brigade in Egypt. He saw active service with the brigade at Mersa Matruh, commanding 'Braforce' under the 2nd Division on the Egyptian frontier later in 1941, and then with the 1st Division on the Gazala Line from February to May 1942. He returned temporarily to South Africa as officer commanding Cape Fortress until rejoining his brigade at El Alamein in August 1942. There he commanded the brigade in the Second Battle of El Alamein in October–November 1942. He returned to South Africa as second-in-command of the 1st Division.

Poole assumed command, with the rank of major general, of the 6th South African Armoured Division on its formation in February 1943. He retained command throughout its training in the Middle East and subsequent service in Italy as part of the British Eighth Army. After the liberation of Florence, the division became part of the Fifth United States Army. At the end of the war, he became General Officer Administration of all South African troops in the Allied Central Mediterranean Force until their repatriation on 2 March 1946.

During the Second World War, Poole was twice mentioned in despatches, received the Distinguished Service Order, and was invested as a Companion of the Order of the Bath and as a Commander of the Order of the British Empire. He was among the very few South Africans to be invested as a Commander of the United States Legion of Merit, and was invested as a Commander of the French Legion of Honour. He also received the French Croix de Guerre.

== Post-war and diplomatic career ==
In 1948, Poole was passed over as chief of staff by the newly elected National Party government of Dr D. F. Malan and posted to Berlin to head the South African military mission there. After this he switched to a diplomatic career. He was subsequently appointed envoy extraordinary and minister plenipotentiary to Italy, Greece and Egypt, and in 1954 was transferred to Argentina and Chile. In 1960, he became ambassador to Greece.

As a diplomat, Poole was invested as a Knight of the Most Venerable Order of the Hospital of St John of Jerusalem. Whilst ambassador to Greece, he was decorated with the Order of King George I in 1964. St Andrew's College, Grahamstown, annually award the General Evered Poole Cadet Cup to the winning house in the inter-house cadet competition.

In his last years, Poole suffered from a lung ailment which forced his retirement in 1966. In retirement, he spent half the year at his home in Hermanus, Cape Province, and the other half in Greece, aboard the Poole's yacht Estrellita. He died on 9 March 1969.

== Awards and decorations ==
- Order of the Bath (Companion) (CB)
- Order of the British Empire (Commander) (CBE)
- Distinguished Service Order (DSO)
- Venerable Order of Saint John (Gr II - Knight of Justice or Grace) (KStJ)
- 1939–45 Star
- Africa Star
- Italy Star
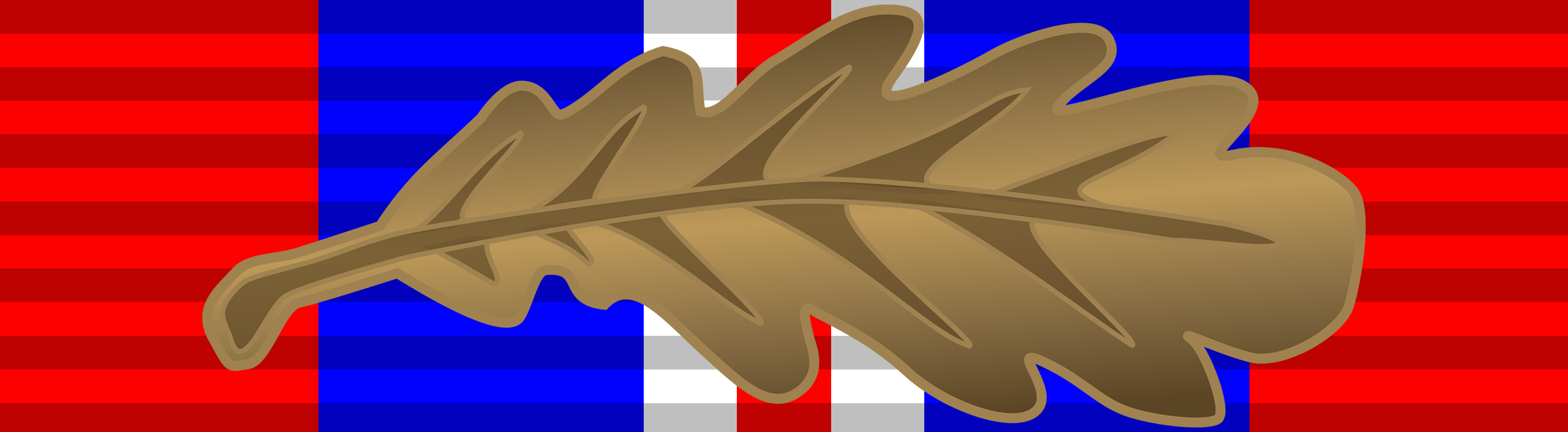
- War Medal 1939 – 1945 (Mentioned in Dispatches) (MID)
- Africa Service Medal (WWII)
- Legion of Merit (Commander) (LOM)
- Légion d'honneur (Commander – France)
- Order of George I (Greece)
- Croix de guerre 1939-1945 (France)

Military offices
Preceded by Harry Cilliers as Deputy Chief of Staff	Deputy Chief of General Staff; 1946 – 1948	Succeeded by Pieter de Waal as Director-General Land Forces
Preceded by JJC Hamman	Commandant South African Military College; 1938 – 1940	Succeeded by Jock B Kriegler
Preceded by Pieter de Waal	Officer Commanding Special Service Battalion; 1934 – 1935	Succeeded by J Daniel
