= James Dalgleish =

South African Navy officer

Commodore James Dalgleish CBE
- Born: 8 July 1891; Leith, Scotland
- Died: 30 May 1964 (aged 72)
- Military career
- Branch: South African Navy
- Rank: Commodore
- Commands: Chief of the South African Navy
- Conflicts: World War I World War II
- Awards: Order of the British Empire CBE

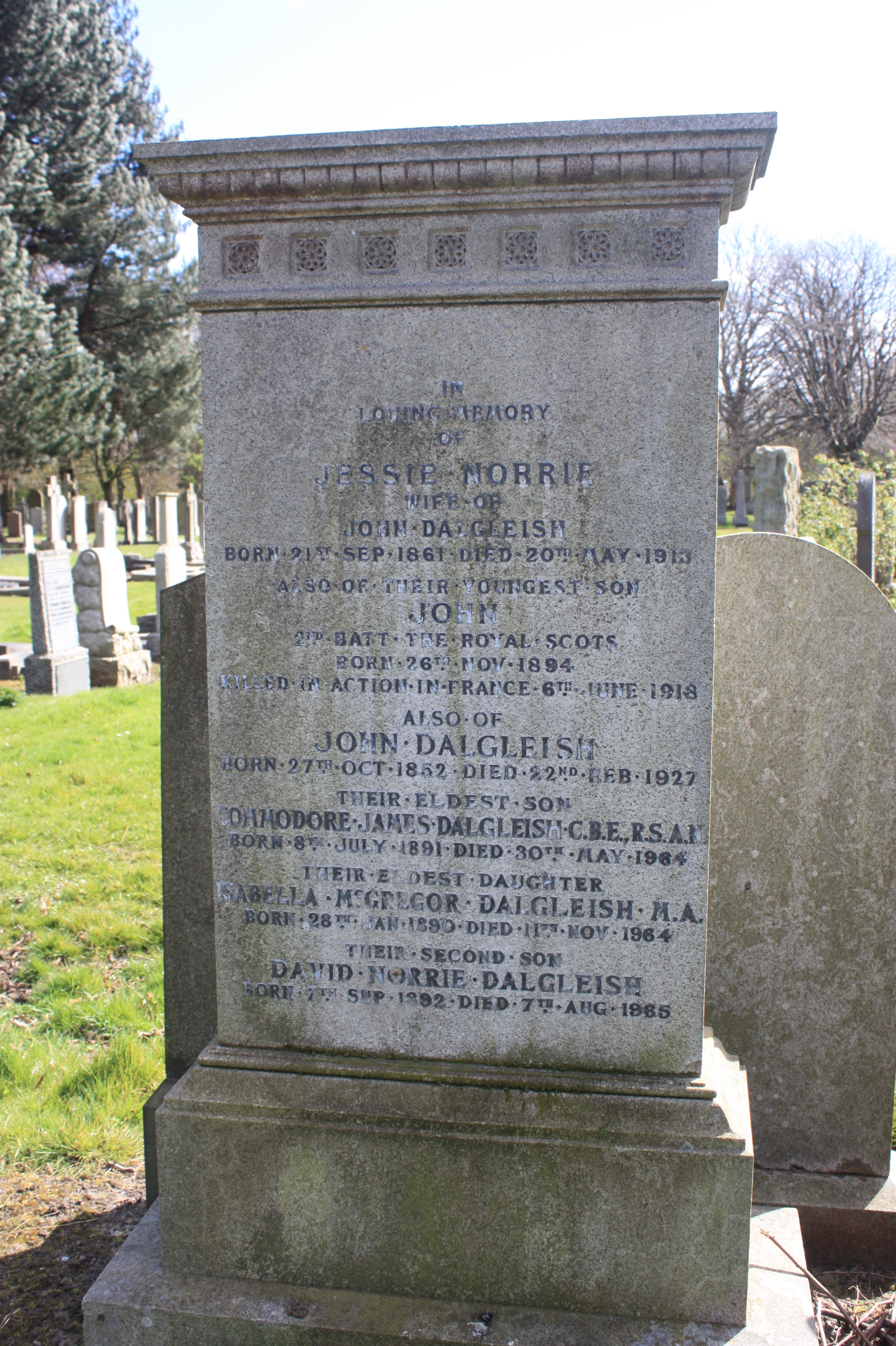
The grave of Commodore James Dalgleish, Warriston Cemetery, Edinburgh

Commodore James Dalgleish CBE (1891–1964) served as the Chief of the Seaward Defence Force, which later became the South African Navy.

== Life ==
He was born in Edinburgh on 8 July 1891, the eldest son of John Dalgleish and his wife Jessie Norrie.

== Naval career ==
He joined the Merchant Navy at age 16 and served in the Royal Navy during World War I.

After demobilisation he served as a navigation officer on a survey vessel before being transferred to the hydrographic section of the South African Naval Service. He later commanded the HMSAS Protea until it was decommissioned in 1933.

He became director of the Seaward Defence Force on 28 March 1941 after the death of Rear Admiral Guy Hallifax and was promoted to the rank of captain. He was promoted to acting commodore on 1 May 1946 and confirmed in that rank on 1 August 1946.

He retired on 30 November 1946.

He died on 30 May 1964, and is buried with his parents in Warriston Cemetery in north Edinburgh. The grave lies in the modern sections to the north.

== Awards and decorations ==
- Order of the British Empire (Commander) (CBE)

Military offices
Preceded by Guy Hallifax	Director, South African Naval Forces; 1941–1946	Next: Frederick Dean
