= Graaff-Reinet Commando =

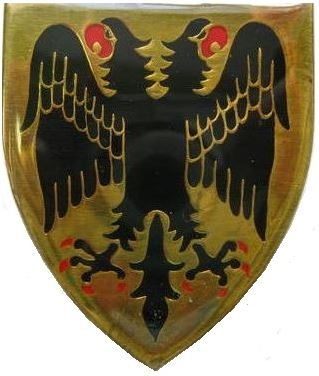
- Graaff Reinet Commando emblem
- Active: 1789-2002
- Country: South Africa
- Allegiance: Batavian Republic; Cape Colony; Union of South Africa; Republic of South Africa; Republic of South Africa
- Branch: South African Army; South African Army
- Type: Infantry
- Role: Light Infantry
- Size: One Battalion
- Part of: South African Infantry Corps; Army Territorial Reserve
- Garrison/HQ: Graaff-Reinet

Graaff-Reinet Commando was a light infantry regiment of the South African Army. It formed part of the South African Army Infantry Formation as well as the South African Territorial Reserve.

== History ==
=== Origin ===
Commandos from the Graaff Reinet area are some of the earliest examples of civil defence in South Africa, as they can be traced back to the 1st, 2nd and 3rd Frontier Wars.

=== Operations ===
==== With the Cape Colony ====
===== Second Frontier War =====
With the threat of increased Xhosa penetration into the Zuurveld. In 1793 a large-scale war was triggered when frontiersmen join Ndlambe, a regent of the Western Xhosas, in their war against the Gunukwebe clans.

Two Government commandos under the landdrosts of Graaff-Reinet and Swellendam penetrated into Xhosa territory as far as the Buffalo River and capturing cattle, but were unable to clear the Zuurveld.

===== The Ngqika Rebellion =====
On 3 January 1878 the Burgher Act was published which enabled the government to call out burgher commandos.

==== With the UDF ====
By 1940, rifle associations were under control of the National Reserve of Volunteers. These rifle associations were re-designated as commandos by 1948.

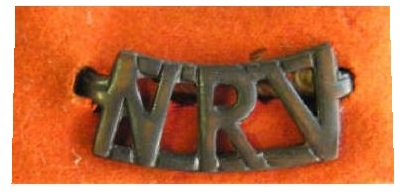
UDF era National Reserve of Volunteers shoulder tab

==== With the SADF ====
During this era, the unit was mainly used for area force protection, search and cordones as well as stock theft control assistance to the rural police.

==== With the SANDF ====
===== Disbandment =====
This unit, along with all other Commando units was disbanded after a decision by South African President Thabo Mbeki to disband all Commando Units. The Commando system was phased out between 2003 and 2008 "because of the role it played in the apartheid era", according to the Minister of Safety and Security Charles Nqakula.

== Unit Insignia ==
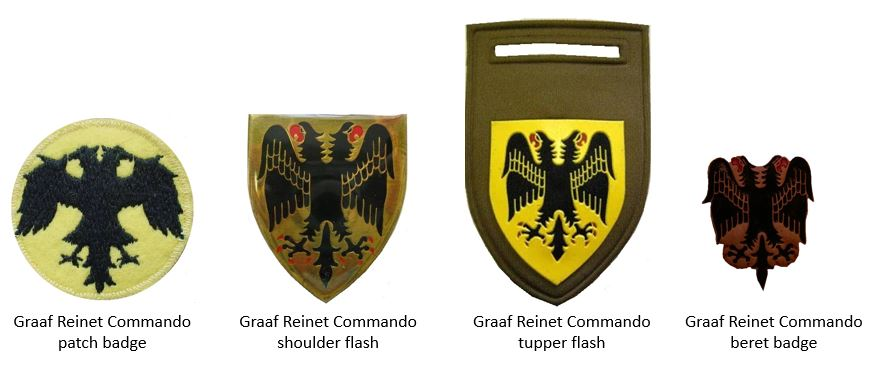
SADF era Graaf Reinet Commando insignia

== Leadership ==
Leadership
From	Honorary Colonels	To	Ribbon
	No known incumbents		
From	Commanding Officers	To	Ribbon
	No known incumbents		
From	Regimental Sergeants Major	To	Ribbon
	No known incumbents		

== See also ==
- South African Commando System
