= Donkin Commando =

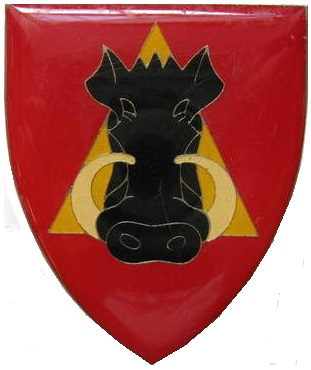
- Donkin Commando emblem
- Country: South Africa
- Allegiance: Republic of South Africa; Republic of South Africa
- Branch: South African Army; South African Army
- Type: Infantry
- Role: Light Infantry
- Size: One Battalion
- Part of: South African Infantry Corps; Army Territorial Reserve, Group 6
- Garrison/HQ: Donkin, Port Elizabeth

Donkin Commando, later Donkin Regiment, was a light infantry regiment of the South African Army. It formed part of the South African Army Infantry Formation as well as the South African Territorial Reserve.

== History ==
=== Origin ===
This unit was one of several 'urban commandos' which were established in 1962, when the Army's focus was on internal security. It was transferred from the Commandos to the Citizen Force (South African Infantry Corps) in the 1980s, and renamed 'Donkin Regiment'. The battalion was disbanded in 1997.

=== Operations ===
==== With the SADF ====
During this era, the unit was mainly used for area force protection, search and cordones as well as other assistance to the local police.

The unit resorted under the command of Group 6.

==== With the SANDF ====
===== Disbandment =====
This unit was disbanded as part of a scaling-down of the Citizen Force in 1997.

== Unit Insignia ==
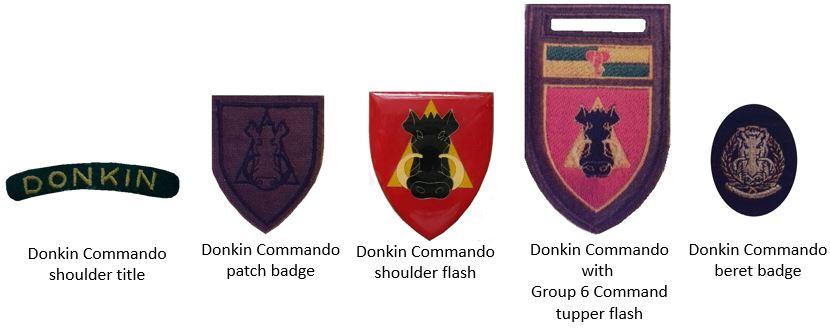
SADF era Donkin Commando insignia

== Leadership ==
Leadership
From	Honorary Colonels	To	Ribbon
	No known incumbents		
From	Commanding Officers	To	Ribbon
	No known incumbents		
From	Regimental Sergeants Major	To	Ribbon
	No known incumbents		

== See also ==
- South African Commando System
