= Pieter de Waal =

South African military officer

Brigadier Pieter de Waal CB CBE
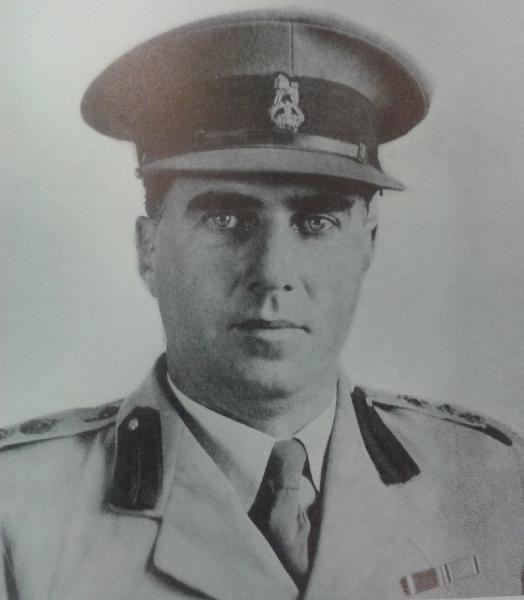
- Colonel Pieter de Waal
- Born: December 31, 1899; Zeerust, South African Republic
- Died: June 1977; Wynberg, Cape Town, Cape Province, South Africa (now Western Cape)
- Military career
- Allegiance: South Africa
- Branch: South African Navy
- Rank: Brigadier
- Service number: 179910V
- Awards: Order of the Bath CB Order of the British Empire CBE

Brigadier Pieter de Waal CB CBE (31 December 1899, Zeerust – June 1977, Wynberg) was a South African military commander. He joined the Union Defence Forces as a coastal gunner in 1922.

== Military career ==
From 1934 to 1940, he was Director of Operations and Training (under various titles) at Defence Headquarters. He served as Deputy Chief of the General Staff from 1940 until 1944, when he was seconded to the staff of General Dwight Eisenhower as South African Liaison Officer to Supreme Headquarters Allied Expeditionary Forces in England for the rest of World War II.

After the war, Brig de Waal served as Quartermaster-General from 1945 to 1951, and as Naval and Marine Chief of Staff from 1951 to 1952. As NMCS he was in command of both the South African Navy and the short-lived South Africa Marine Corps.

He served as Military & Naval Attaché to the US from 1953 to 1954

== Awards and decorations ==
=== Companion of the Order of the Bath ===
On 1 January 1946, Brigadier de Waal was made a Companion of the Order of the Bath. The Notice in the London Gazette reads as follows:

The KING has been graciously pleased, on the advice of His Majesty's Ministers for the Union of South Africa, to give orders for the following appointment to the Most Honourable Order of the Bath: —

To be an Additional Member of the Military Division of the Third Class, or Companions, of the said: Most Honourable Order: —

Brigadier Pieter de WAAL, C.B.E. (P.179910V) South African Staff Corps (V).

=== Commander of the Order of the British Empire ===
On 1 January 1944, Brigadier de Waal was made a Commander of the Order of the British Empire. The Notice in the London Gazette reads as follows:

The KING has been graciously pleased, on the advice of His Majesty's Ministers for the Union of South Africa, to give orders for the following appointments to the Most Excellent Order of the British Empire:

To be Additional Commanders of the Military Division of the said Most Excellent Order:

Brigadier Pieter de Waal, South African Staff Corps (V)

=== List ===
- Order of the Bath (Companion) (CB)
- Order of the British Empire (Commander) (CBE)

== See also ==
- List of South African military chiefs
- South African Navy

Military offices
New title	Naval & Marine Chief of Staff; 1951–1952	Succeeded by Hugo Biermann
Preceded by Frederick Dean	Director, South African Naval Forces	Renamed Naval & Marine Chief of Staff
Preceded by George Brink	OC SA Military College; 1933–1934	Succeeded by DJ Roux
Preceded by George Brink	OC Special Service Battalion; 1933–1934	Succeeded by Evered Poole
