= 11 Commando (South African) =

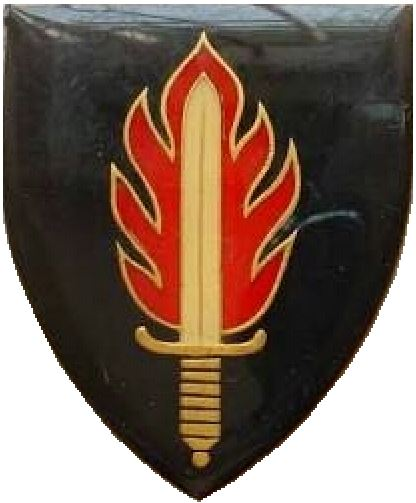
- 11 Commando emblem
- Active: November 1973–2003
- Disbanded: 2003
- Country: South Africa
- Allegiance: Republic of South Africa
- Branch: South African Army
- Type: Artillery
- Size: Regiment
- Part of: South African Army Infantry Corps; Army Territorial Reserve
- Garrison/HQ: Kimberley
- Motto(s): Per Gladium (The Sword)

11 Commando was an infantry training battalion of the South African Army Infantry Formation Corps.

== Origin ==
11 Commando was formed at Kimberly around November 1973. The majority of the Danie Theron Combat School training/recruit wing staff were transferred to this unit.

The majority of the recruits were area bound farmers, business owners, or essentials services).

These recruits were to be allocated to regional commandos after their initial training.

=== Relationship with Intelligence ===
When 11 Commando closed down, the Intelligence School took control of the facility and continued to use 11 Commando's insignia.

In September 1982, SA Intelligence School took over from 11 Commando. The unit flash with the red Chief of Army Higher Formation bar was introduced thereafter. In December 1988, SA Intelligence School moved to Potchefstroom. From January 1989, the C Army reporting line was changed to the regional command reporting structure, so the school fell under North West Command from 1989 until the SADF was replaced by the SANDF in 1994, after which the regional command system fell away and was replaced by a new Army structure based on formations.

== Commanding Officers ==
- Commandant W.S. van der Waals 1973
- Commandant A.K. de Lager 1974
- Commandant R, van Rensburg 1977

== Insignia ==
11 Commando retained the standard commando beret badge

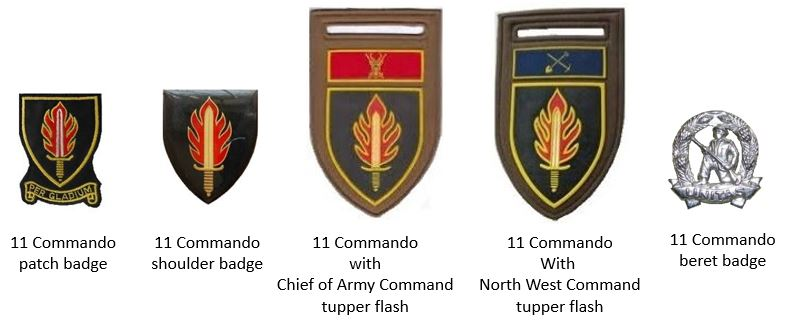
SADF era 11 Commando insignia

== See also ==
- South African Commando System
