= Kirkwood Commando =

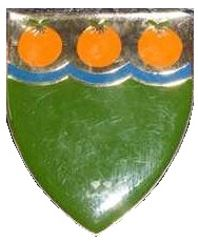
- Kirkwood Commando emblem
- Active: 15 February 1950 - 2003
- Country: South Africa
- Allegiance: Republic of South Africa; Republic of South Africa
- Branch: South African Army; South African Army
- Type: Infantry
- Role: Light Infantry
- Size: One Battalion
- Part of: South African Infantry Corps; Army Territorial Reserve
- Garrison/HQ: Kirkwood
- Motto: Unitas

Kirkwood Commando was a light infantry regiment of the South African Army. It formed part of the South African Army Infantry Formation as well as the South African Territorial Reserve.

== History ==
=== Operations ===
==== With the SADF ====
During this era, the unit was mainly used for area force protection, search and cordones as well as stock theft control assistance to the local police.

==== Disbandment ====
This unit, along with all other Commando units was disbanded after a decision by South African President Thabo Mbeki to disband all Commando Units. The Commando system was phased out between 2003 and 2008 "because of the role it played in the apartheid era", according to the Minister of Safety and Security Charles Nqakula.

== Unit Insignia ==
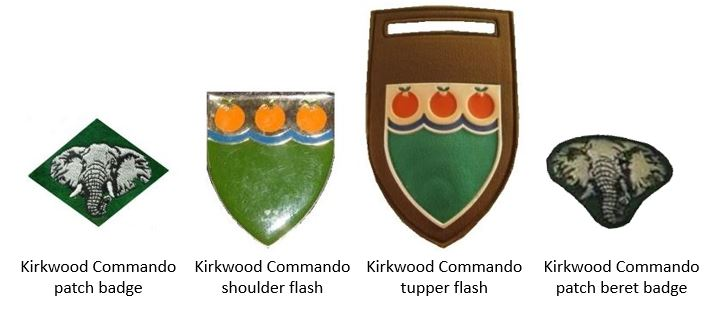
SADF era Kirkwood Commando insignia

The cap badge represents an iconic elephant from the Addo Elephant National Park called Hapoor due to a missing piece. The three oranges represent the citrus produce of the area.

== See also ==
- South African Commando System
