= Amatola Commando =

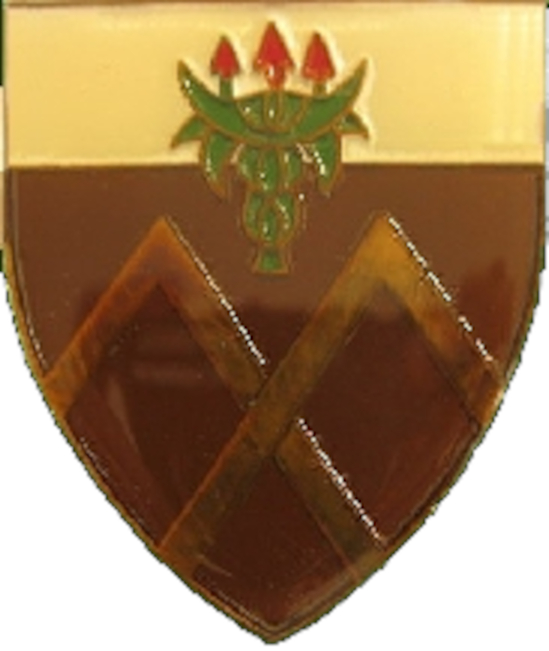
- Amatola Commando emblem
- Active: 3 January 1878 – 2003
- Disbanded: 2003
- Country: South Africa
- Allegiance: Cape Colony; Union of South Africa; Republic of South Africa; Republic of South Africa
- Branch: South African Army; South African Army
- Type: Infantry
- Role: Light Infantry
- Size: One Battalion
- Part of: South African Infantry Corps; Army Territorial Reserve
- Garrison/HQ: Stutterheim

Amatola Commando was a light infantry regiment of the South African Army. It formed part of the South African Army Infantry Formation as well as the South African Territorial Reserve.

== History ==
=== Origin ===
==== Colony Frontier Wars ====
===== The Ngqika Rebellion =====
On 31 December 1877 martial law was proclaimed in the districts of Komgha and Stutterheim and on 3 January 1878 the Burgher Act was published which enabled government to call out burgher commandos.

=== Operations ===
==== With the SADF ====
During this era, the unit was mainly used for area force protection, search and cordons as well as stock theft control assistance to the rural police.

==== With the SANDF ====
===== Disbandment =====
This unit, along with all other Commando units was disbanded after a decision by South African President Thabo Mbeki to disband all Commando Units. The Commando system was phased out between 2003 and 2008 "because of the role it played in the apartheid era", according to the Minister of Safety and Security Charles Nqakula.

== Unit Insignia ==
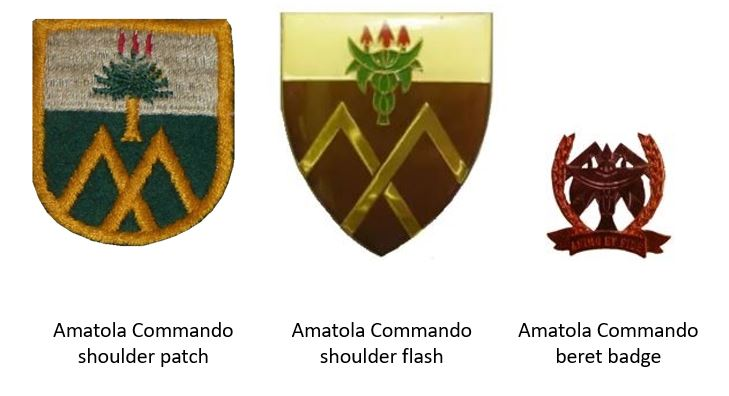
SADF era Amatola Commando insignia

== Leadership ==
Leadership
From	Honorary Colonels	To	Ribbon
	No known incumbents		
From	Commanding Officer	To	Ribbon
	No known incumbents		
From	Regimental Sergeant Major	To	Ribbon
	No known incumbents		

== See also ==
- South African Commando System
