= Stormberg Commando =

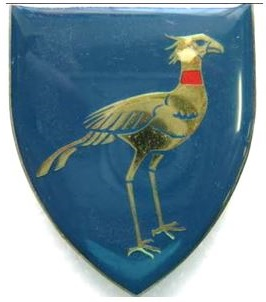
- Stormberg Commando emblem
- Country: South Africa
- Allegiance: Cape Colony; Union of South Africa; Republic of South Africa; Republic of South Africa
- Branch: South African Army; South African Army
- Type: Infantry
- Role: Light Infantry
- Size: One Battalion
- Part of: South African Infantry Corps; Army Territorial Reserve,
- Garrison/HQ: Burgersdorp Eastern Cape

Stormberg Commando was a light infantry regiment of the South African Army. It formed part of the South African Army Infantry Formation as well as the South African Territorial Reserve.

== History ==
=== Origin ===
==== Cape Rebels ====
Although part of the Cape Colony, many families in this area had ties with relatives across the river in the Orange Free State and sympathy with the Boer Republics. Many locals aided the Free State Commandos in the invasion of the Cape Colony in 1899.

Commandant Jan Hendrik Olivier the local commander, sided with the Free State, attacking and capturing Aliwal North on 13 November 1899, proclaiming it Free State territory.

==== With the SADF ====
The unit was renamed from the Burgersdorp Commando to the Stormberg Commando around 1972.

The local gaol, which is also a national monument in Piet Retief street was the headquarters of the commando.

The unit resorted under the command of the SADF's Group 22.

During this era, the commando was mainly used for area force protection, cordones and search operations assisting the police and patrolling the Lesotho border.

==== With the SANDF ====
===== Disbandment =====
This unit, along with all other Commando units was disbanded after a decision by South African President Thabo Mbeki to disband all Commando Units. The Commando system was phased out between 2003 and 2008 "because of the role it played in the apartheid era", according to the Minister of Safety and Security Charles Nqakula.

== Unit emblems ==
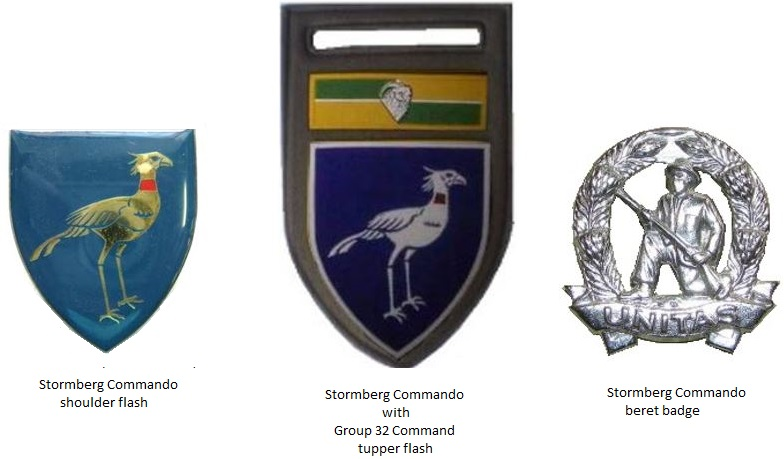
SADF era Stormberg Commando insignia

== Leadership ==
Leadership
From	Honorary Colonels	To	Ribbon
	No known incumbents		
From	Commanding Officer	To	Ribbon
	No known incumbents		
From	Regimental Sergeant Major	To	Ribbon
	No known incumbents		

== See also ==
- South African Commando System
