= De Mist Commando =

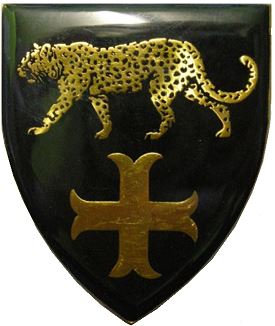
- De Mist Commando emblem
- Active: 1984-2006
- Country: South Africa
- Allegiance: Republic of South Africa; Republic of South Africa
- Branch: South African Army; South African Army
- Type: Infantry
- Role: Light Infantry
- Size: One Battalion
- Part of: South African Infantry Corps; Army Territorial Reserve, Group 6
- Garrison/HQ: Uitenhage
- Motto: "Parati erimus" We will be ready

De Mist Commando was a light infantry regiment of the South African Army. It formed part of the South African Army Infantry Formation as well as the South African Territorial Reserve.

== History ==
=== Origin ===
==== Town Guard ====
Commandos units in Uitenhage can be traced back to 1846 when a Town Guard was established.

=== Operations ===
==== With the SADF ====
The modern Uitenhage Commando was established at Uitenhage on 29 June 1973 and was later renamed to De Mist Commando on 7 November 1984. Uitenhage Commando is not to be confused with Uitenhage Regiment which was an industrial unit.

===== Reaction Force =====
In 1955, the unit became a fully counter insurgency battalion with reaction capability.

Under the SADF structure, this commando resorted under Group 6 as part of the Eastern Province Command.

==== With the SANDF ====
===== Disbandment =====
This unit, along with all other Commando units was disbanded after a decision by South African President Thabo Mbeki to disband all Commando Units. The Commando system was phased out between 2003 and 2008 "because of the role it played in the apartheid era", according to the Minister of Safety and Security Charles Nqakula.

== Unit Insignia ==
The emblem of this commando was approved in 1973 and soon thereafter it received the freedom of the town of Despatch. The modified emblem was approved in 1986.

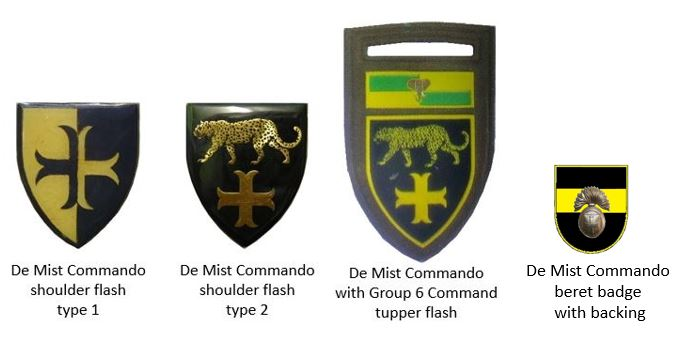
SADF era De Mist Commando insignia

== Leadership ==
Leadership
From	Honorary Colonels	To	Ribbon
	No known incumbents		
From	Commanding Officers	To	Ribbon
	No known incumbents		
From	Regimental Sergeants Major	To	Ribbon
	No known incumbents		

== See also ==
- South African Commando System
