= Regiment Uitenhage =

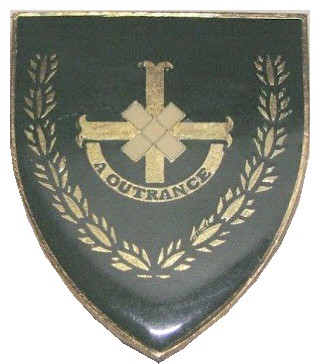
- Regiment Uitenhage emblem
- Active: 1965
- Country: South Africa
- Allegiance: Republic of South Africa
- Branch: South African Army
- Type: Infantry
- Size: Regiment
- Part of: South African Army Infantry Corps; Army Conventional Reserve
- Garrison/HQ: Uitenhage
- Motto(s): Motto Attaque a outrance (Attack to excess)

Regiment Uitenhage was an infantry regiment of the South African Army.

== Origin ==
Regiment Uitenhage was formed as an Afrikaans language based unit cadre unit in the South African Army's 1965 expansion and formed a Citizen Force infantry battalion by 1966.

The regiment was not the first military unit in the area and was considered the descendants of the Uitenhage Volunteer Rifles and all other Volunteer Corps raised in Uitenhage in the 19th century.

The regiment drew its members from the surrounding areas of Uitenhage and Despatch. The regiment was predominantly blue collar Afrikaners mainly working in the automotive industry in Uitenhage or at the numerous railway workshops in the area.

Members of this regiment were utilised in 1978, around Mpacha on the eastern tip of the Caprivi Strip opposite Zambia.

== Insignia ==
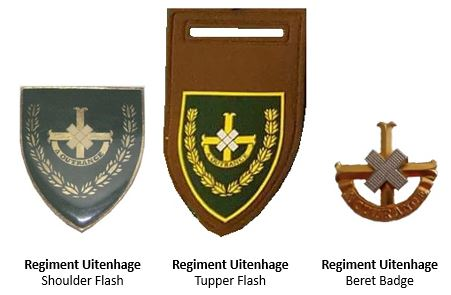
SADF era Regiment Uitenhage insignia
