= Western Province Command =

- Active: 1959 - 1999
- Disbanded: 1999
- Country: South Africa
- Type: Command
Part of
- Union Defence Force
- South African Defence Force
- South African National Defence Force
- Garrison/HQ: Cape Town, South Africa
- Mottos: Fidelitas et Honor (Fidelity and Honour)

Commanders
- Notable commanders: General Magnus Malan

Western Province Command was a command of the South African Army.

== History ==
=== Origin ===
==== Union Defence Force ====
Under the Union Defence Force, South Africa was originally divided into 9 military districts. By the 1930s this area became Cape Command. Cape Command, (with its headquarters at the Castle of Good Hope, Cape Town, included 3rd Infantry Brigade, 8th Infantry Brigade (Oudtshoorn), the Coast Artillery Brigade (two heavy batteries, two medium batteries, and the Cape Field Artillery), and a battery of the 1st Anti-Aircraft Regiment.

Western Province Command itself appears to have formed in 1959. Brig Magnus Malan, later Chief of the SADF, took command in 1971.

==== SADF ====
From 1 August 1974, units transferred from Western Province Command to the new 71 Motorised Brigade included the Cape Field Artillery, the Cape Town Highlanders, Regiment Westelike Provinsie, Regiment Boland, Regiment Oranjerivier, a South African Engineer Corps field squadron, 74 Signal Squadron SACS, 4 Maintenance Unit, 30 Field Workshop SAOSC, and 3 Field Ambulance. 12 Supply and Transport Company, originally established on 22 August 1961, became 4 Maintenance Unit on 1 September 1971.

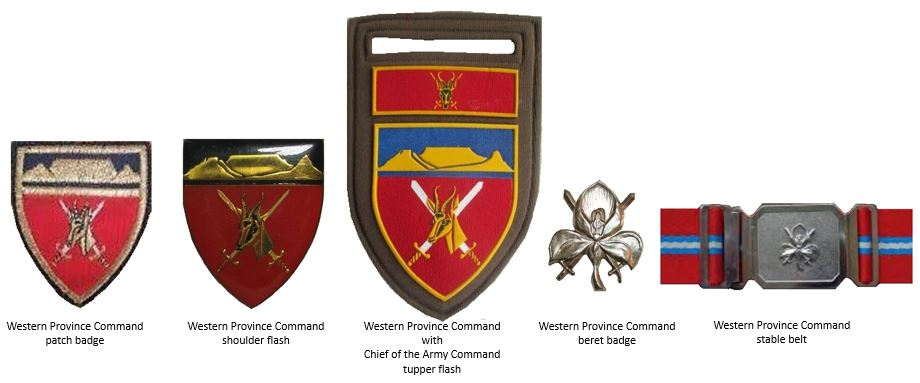
SADF era Western Cape Command insignia

By the early 1980s Western Province Command included the Cape Garrison Artillery, 101 Signal Squadron, 6 Base Ordnance Depot, Command Workshops (all at Cape Town) the South African Cape Corps Battalion (Eerste River, Western Cape), 2 Military Hospital, 3 Field Ambulance, and three Commandos (all at Wynberg) and 10 Anti-Aircraft Regiment SAA and 4 Electronics Workshops (both at Youngsfield Military Base at Ottery, Cape Town).

==== Disbandment ====
This Command was disbanded c. 1999 after the South African Defence Review 1998.

== Groups and Commando units ==
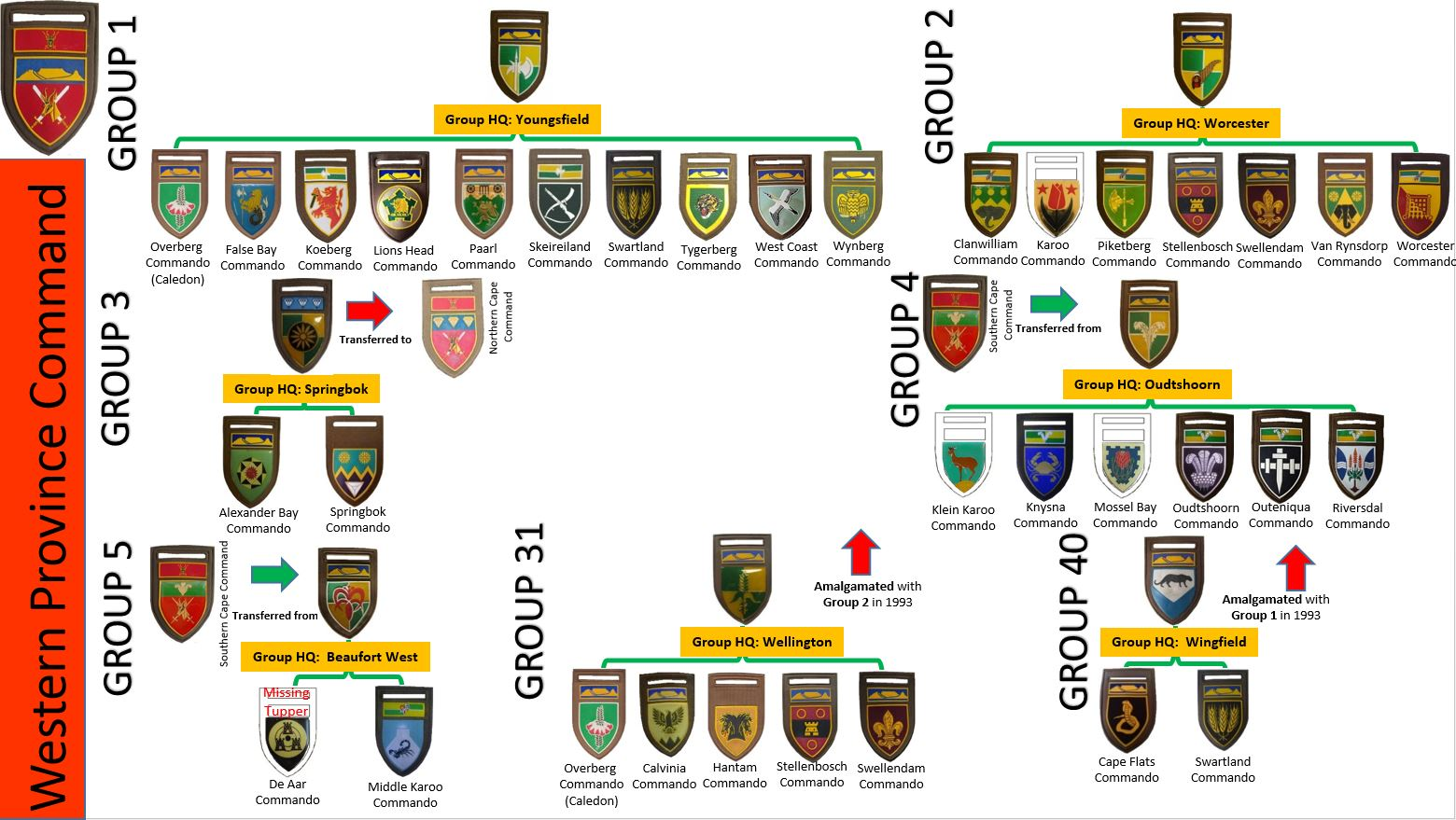
SADF era Western Province Command Commando structure

=== Group 1 (Youngsfield) ===
- Overberg Commando
- False Bay Commando
- Koeberg Commando
- Lions Head Commando
- Skiereiland Commando
- Swartland Commando
- Tygerberg Commando
- Wildcoast Commando
- Wynberg Commando

=== Group 31 (Wellington) ===
- Caledon Commando
- Paarl Commando
- Stellenbosch Commando
- Swellendam Commando
- Winterberg Commando
- Worcester Commando

=== Group 40 (Wingsfield) ===
- Clanwilliam Commando
- Piketberg Commando
- Swartland Commando
- Van Rhynsdorp Commando
- West Coast Commando

== Commanders ==
Officers Commanding
From	Cape Command (c. 1930–1959)	To	Ribbon
December 1933	Col George Brink CB,CBE,DSO	31 January 1937	Order of the Bath CB Order of the British Empire CBE Distinguished Service Order DSO
From	Western Province Command (1959–1999)	To	Ribbon
1969	Brig Jan Fourie	1971	
1971	Brig Magnus Malan SM	1972	Southern Cross Medal SM
1972	Brig Helm Roos	n.d.	

== See also ==
- South African Army Order of Battle 1940
