= 16 Reception Depot =

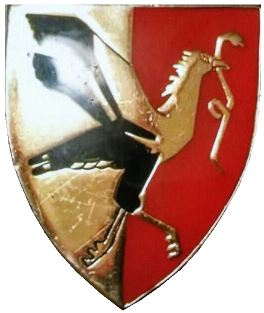
- 16 Reception Depot emblem
- Country: South Africa
- Allegiance: Republic of South Africa; Republic of South Africa
- Branch: South African Army; South African Army
- Type: Mobilisation Depot
- Part of: South African Personnel Service Corps

16 Reception Depot was an administrative unit of the Personnel Service Corps of the South African Army.

== History ==
=== Origin ===
16 Reception Depot was activated as the reception depot to service the then Western Cape Command.

=== SADF era and the Bush War ===
The unit was used to mobilize white troops in the greater Western Cape area. This involved:

- the registering of young white males at schools
- the issuing of call-up papers
- confirmation of the recruits arrival
- the transport of these recruits to various allotted training units

=== SANDF era ===
By the early 2000s, Commands were no longer responsible for individual recruitment, making Reception Depots essentially redundant.

== Insignia ==
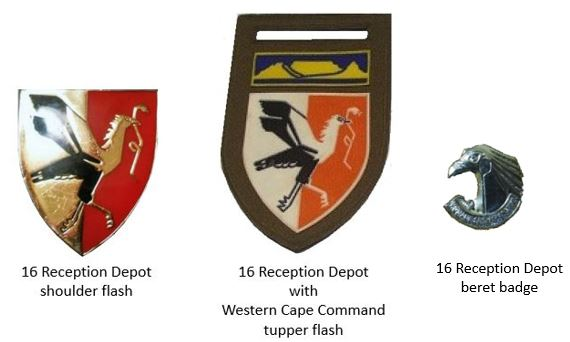
SADF era 16 Reception Depot insignia
