= Winterberg Commando =

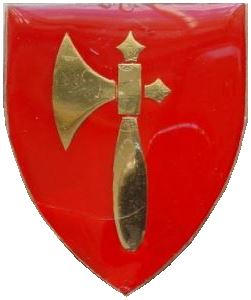
- Winterberg Commando emblem
- Active: 1948-
- Country: South Africa
- Allegiance: Union of South Africa; Republic of South Africa; Republic of South Africa
- Branch: South African Army; South African Army
- Type: Infantry
- Role: Light Infantry
- Size: One Battalion
- Part of: South African Infantry Corps; Army Territorial Reserve
- Garrison/HQ: Winterberg (Eastern Cape)

Winterberg Commando was a light infantry regiment of the South African Army. It formed part of the South African Army Infantry Formation as well as the South African Territorial Reserve.

== History ==
=== Origin ===
The Winterberg Commando was founded in Adelaide, Eastern Cape in 1948.

=== Operations ===
==== With the UDF ====
By 1940, rifle associations were under control of the National Reserve of Volunteers. These rifle associations were re-designated as commandos by 1948.

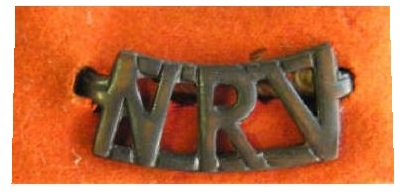
UDF era National Reserve of Volunteers shoulder tab

==== With the SADF ====
The units area of responsibility was significantly large on the outset, and two further commandos namely Katberg and Midland Commandos were developed. Katberg Commando was again reincorporated with the Winterberg Commando in 1979.

During this era, the unit was mainly used for area force protection, search and cordones as well as stock theft control assistance to the rural police.

With the independence of Ciskei, the previous Katberg Commando area was incorporated with the new Homelands territory.

===== Freedom of Adelaide =====
The unit received the Freedom of Adelaide in October 1986.

==== With the SANDF ====
===== Disbandment =====
This unit, along with all other Commando units was disbanded after a decision by South African President Thabo Mbeki to disband all Commando Units. The Commando system was phased out between 2003 and 2008 "because of the role it played in the apartheid era", according to the Minister of Safety and Security Charles Nqakula.

== Unit Insignia ==
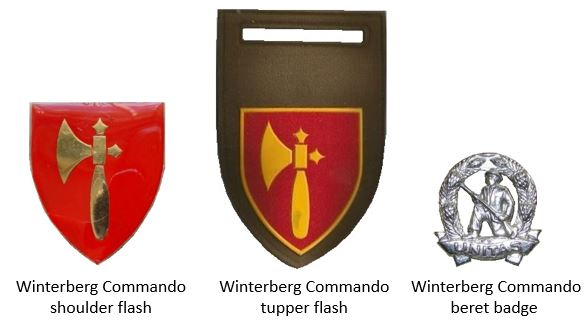
SADF era Winterberg Commando insignia

== Leadership ==
Leadership
From	Honorary Colonels	To	Ribbon
	No known incumbents		
From	Commanding Officers	To	Ribbon
1970	Kommandant A.C. Lombard	1973	
From	Regimental Sergeants Major	To	Ribbon
	No known incumbents		

== See also ==
- South African Commando System
