= Katberg Commando =

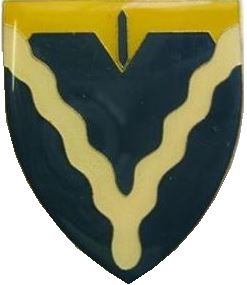
- Katberg Commando emblem
- Active: 1948-1979
- Country: South Africa
- Allegiance: Republic of South Africa; Republic of South Africa
- Branch: South African Army; South African Army
- Type: Infantry
- Role: Light Infantry
- Size: One Battalion
- Part of: South African Infantry Corps; Army Territorial Reserve
- Garrison/HQ: Alice, Eastern Cape Katberg

Katberg Commando was a light infantry regiment of the South African Army. It formed part of the South African Army Infantry Formation as well as the South African Territorial Reserve.

== History ==
=== Origin ===
The Winterberg Commando was founded in Adelaide in 1948 and this unit is considered a development of that unit.

=== Operations ===
==== With the SADF ====
The units area of responsibility was significantly large on the outset, and two further commandos namely Katberg and Midland Commandos were developed.

During this era, the unit was mainly used for area force protection, search and cordones as well as stock theft control assistance to the local police.

Katberg Commando was again reincorporated with the Winterberg Commando in 1979.

===== Amalgamation =====
With the independence of Ciskei, the previous Katberg Commando area was incorporated with the new Homelands territory.

==== With the SANDF ====
===== Disbandment =====
All other Commando units was disbanded after a decision by South African President Thabo Mbeki to disband all Commando Units. The Commando system was phased out between 2003 and 2008 "because of the role it played in the apartheid era", according to the Minister of Safety and Security Charles Nqakula.

== See also ==
- South African Commando System
