= Worcester Commando =

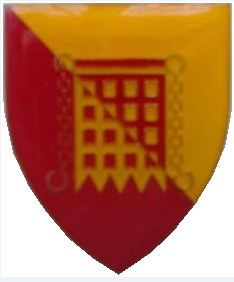
- Founded: June 21, 1883; 143 years ago
- Disbanded: February 14, 2003; 23 years ago
- Country: South Africa
- Allegiance: Cape Colony Union of South Africa: Republic of South Africa; Republic of South Africa
- Branch: South African Army; South African Army
- Type: Infantry
- Role: Light Infantry
- Size: One Battalion
- Part of: South African Infantry Corps; Army Territorial Reserve, Group 2
- Garrison/HQ: Worcester

Worcester Commando was a light infantry regiment of the South African Army. It formed part of the South African Army Infantry Formation as well as the South African Territorial Reserve.

== History ==
=== Origin ===
Worcester Commando was the second oldest unit in South African military history. It started as the Worcester Volunteer Rifles on 21 June 1883 and has had many name changes over the years such as:

- Western Rifles A Company
- Worcester Skiet Kommando

=== Operations ===
==== With the UDF ====
This unit volunteered members for both World Wars and was involved in border duty during the Border War as well as during internal unrest.

The units banner was unveiled in 1910.

==== With the SADF ====
The unit received the Freedom of Worcester in 1982 and received its colours in 1992.

==== With the SANDF ====
===== Disbandment =====
This unit, along with all other Commando units was disbanded after a decision by South African President Thabo Mbeki to disband all Commando Units. The Commando system was phased out between 2003 and 2008 "because of the role it played in the apartheid era", according to the Minister of Safety and Security Charles Nqakula.

== Unit emblems ==
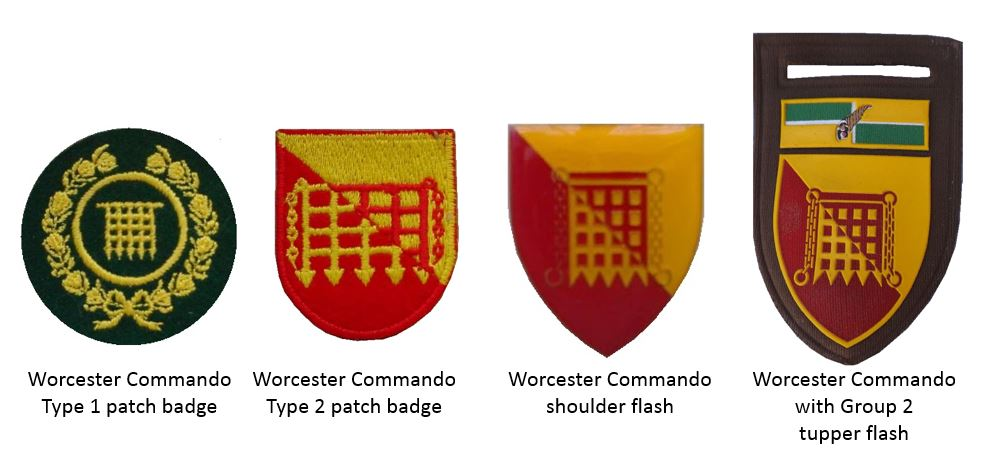
SADF era Worcester Commando emblems

== Leadership ==
Leadership
From	Honorary Colonels	To	Ribbon
	No known incumbents		
From	Commanding Officer	To	Ribbon
	No known incumbents		
From	Regimental Sergeant Major	To	Ribbon
	No known incumbents		

== See also ==
- South African Commando System
