= Koeberg Commando =

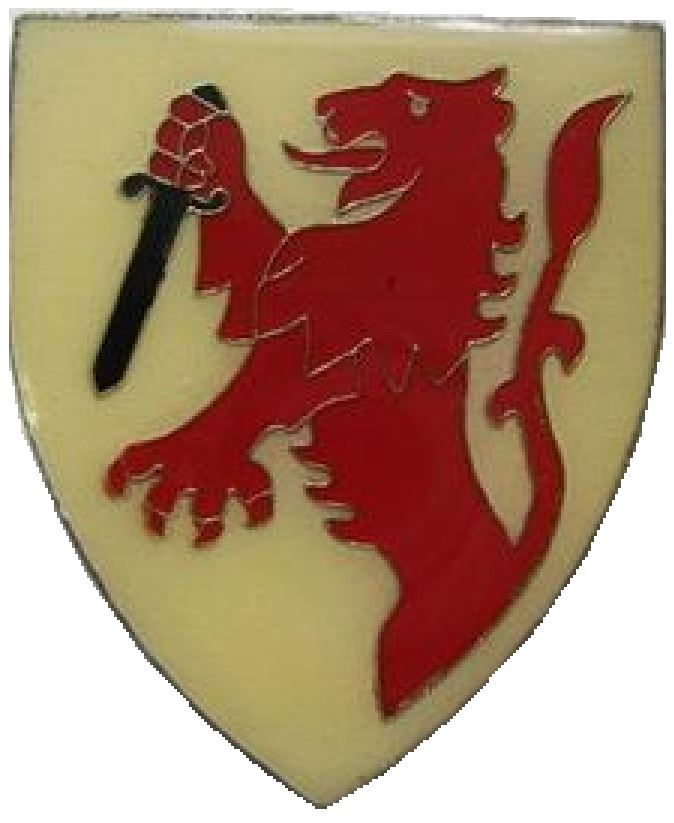
- Founded: 1964; 62 years ago
- Disbanded: 14 February 2003
- Country: South Africa
- Allegiance: Republic of South Africa; Republic of South Africa
- Branch: South African Army; South African Army
- Type: Infantry
- Role: Light Infantry
- Size: One Battalion
- Part of: South African Infantry Corps; Army Territorial Reserve
- Garrison/HQ: Koeberg

Koeberg Commando, later Koeberg Battalion, was a light infantry regiment of the South African Army. It formed part of the South African Infantry Corps.

== History ==
=== Origin ===
Bellville Commando was renamed Durbanville Commando in 1964 and subsequently Koeberg Commando in 1969. The unit was transferred from the Commandos to the Citizen Force (South African Infantry Corps) in August 1983, and renamed 'Koeberg Battalion'.

==== With the SADF ====
During this era, the unit was mainly involved in area force protection, cordon and search operations assisting the local police.

This unit resorted under the command of Group 1.

==== With the SANDF ====
===== Disbandment =====
This unit, along with all other Commando units was disbanded after a decision by South African President Thabo Mbeki to disband all Commando Units. The Commando system was phased out between 2003 and 2008 "because of the role it played in the apartheid era", according to the Minister of Safety and Security Charles Nqakula.

== Unit Insignia ==
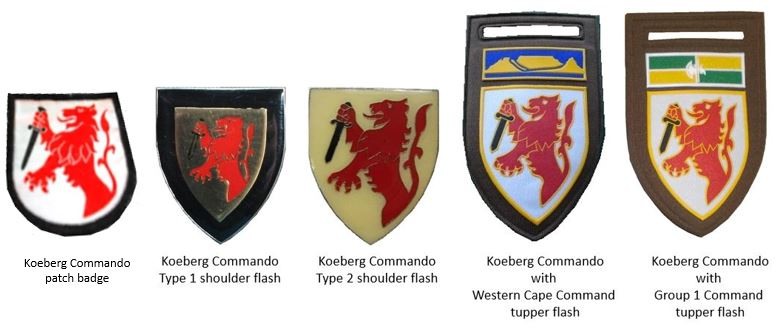
SADF era Koeberg Commando insignia

== See also ==
- South African Commando System
