= Lions Head Commando =

Lion's Head Commando
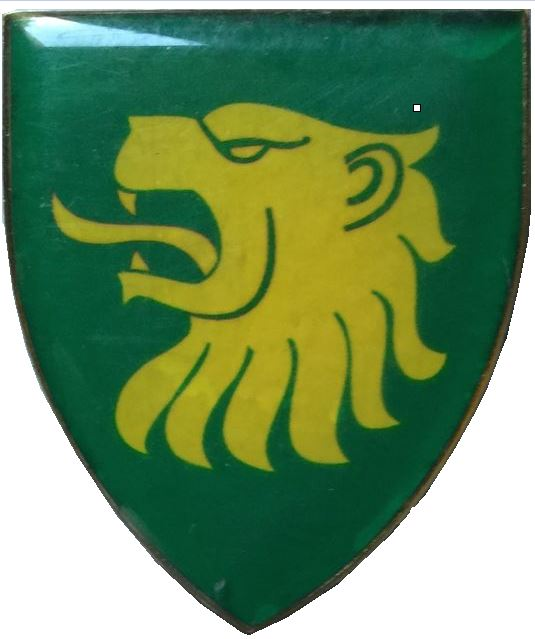
- Founded: July 24, 1978; 46 years ago
- Disbanded: February 14, 2003; 22 years ago
- Country: South Africa
- Allegiance: Republic of South Africa; Republic of South Africa
- Branch: South African Army; South African Army
- Type: Infantry
- Role: Light Infantry
- Size: One Battalion
- Part of: South African Infantry Corps; Army Territorial Reserve, Group 1
- Garrison/HQ: Fort Wynyard, Green Point Cape Town

Lion's Head Commando was a light infantry regiment of the South African Army. It formed part of the South African Army Infantry Formation as well as the South African Territorial Reserve.

== History ==
=== Origin ===
The Lions Head Commando was one of several 'urban commandos' which were established in 1962, when the Army's focus was on internal security.

=== Operations ===
==== With the SADF ====
During this era, the unit was mainly involved in area force protection, cordon and search operations assisting the local police and stock theft control.

The unit was organised under Group 1 Headquarters at Youngsfield part of Western Province Command.

==== With the SANDF ====
===== Disbandment =====
This unit, along with all other Commando units was disbanded after a decision by South African President Thabo Mbeki to disband all Commando Units. The Commando system was phased out between 2003 and 2008 "because of the role it played in the apartheid era", according to the Minister of Safety and Security Charles Nqakula.

== Unit Insignia ==
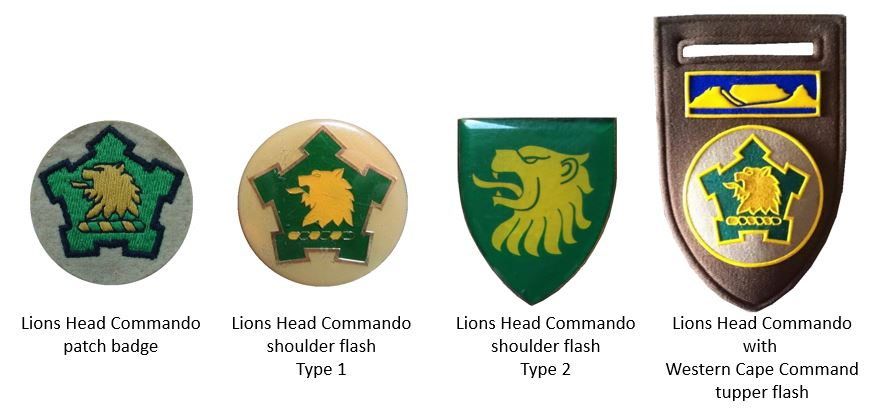
SADF era Lions Head insignia

Note : the flash captioned "Lion's Head Commando shoulder flash Type 2" was designed and approved, and prototypes were made, but it was never worn.

== See also ==
- South African Commando System
