= Regiment Highveld =

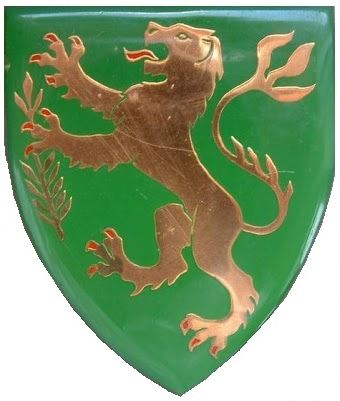
- Regiment Highveld emblem
- Active: 1960
- Country: South Africa
- Allegiance: Republic of South Africa
- Branch: South African Army
- Type: Infantry
- Role: Light Infantry
- Size: One Battalion
- Part of: South African Infantry Corps; Army Territorial Reserve
- Garrison/HQ: Middelburg, Nelspruit
- Motto(s): "Staan Ferm" (Stand Firm)

Regiment Highveld was a motorised infantry regiment of the South African Army. It formed part of the South African Army Infantry Formation. As a reserve unit, it had a status roughly equivalent to that of a present-day British Army Reserve or United States Army National Guard unit.

== History ==
=== Origins ===
Regiment Highveld was formed in Middelburg on 1 January 1960, it also stationed a rear HQ in the town of Nelspruit.

The Regiment originally wore the infantry bokkop but the lion rampant emblem was adopted by 1965.

=== Role and operations ===
Regiment Highveld was utilized in a motorized infantry role and deployed on internal security duties on a regular basis.

=== Disbandment ===
Regiment Highveld was disbanded in 1997.

== Insignia ==
=== Dress Insignia ===
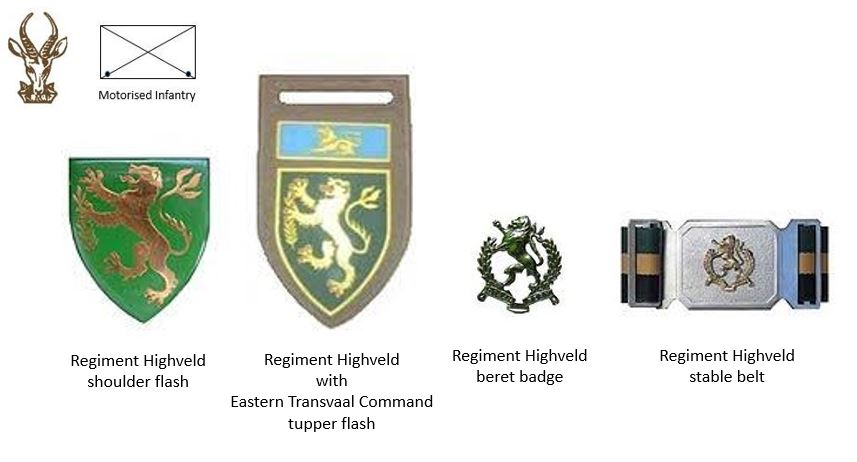
SADF era Regiment Highveld insignia
