= Regiment North Natal =

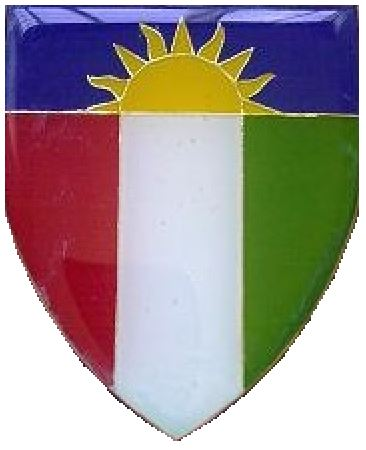
- Regiment North Natal emblem
- Active: 1950
- Allegiance: Republic of South Africa; South Africa
- Branch: South African Army
- Size: Battalion
- Part of: South African Infantry Corps; Army Conventional Reserve
- Garrison/HQ: PaulPietersburg, Vryheid, Newcastle
- Motto(s): Libertatem tenemus (Hold Freedom)
- Battle honours

Commanders
- First Officer Commanding: Commandant Willie Stumph
- Last Officer Commanding: Lt Colonel Ferdie Alberts

Regiment North Natal was an infantry battalion of the South African Army. As a reserve force unit, it had a status roughly equivalent to that of a British Army Reserve or United States Army National Guard unit.

== History ==
Regiment North Natal was established in the 1950s at Paulpietersburg and named originally as Regiment Smuts.

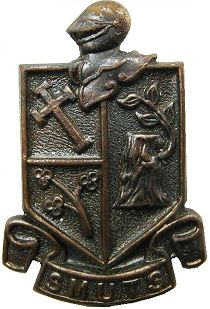
SADF Regiment Smuts beret badge

The regiment was renamed Regiment North Natal in 1961 and its headquarters was moved to Vryheid. Members served in Owamboland in northern South West Africa from 1976 to 1980. The headquarters was finally moved again to Newcastle around 1980.

=== Border War ===
The regiment served in numerous deployments in the Border War in SWA/Namibia where 4 active companies and about 800 Citizen Force members served in the operational and border areas.

=== Democratic elections of 1994 ===
In 1994 the regiment provided reaction force support to the police for South Africa's first democratic elections.

=== Disbandment ===
Regiment North Natal was disbanded in 1997.

=== Freedom of the City ===
Freedom of Vryheid in 1961.

== Regimental emblems ==
=== Dress Insignia ===
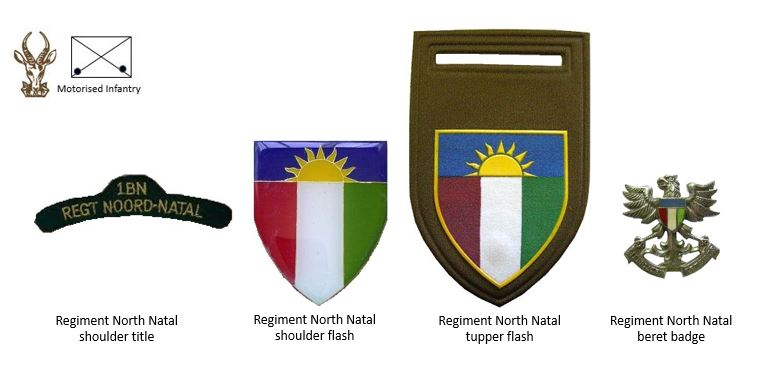
SADF era Regiment North Natal insignia
