= Regiment Vanderbiljpark =

Vanderbijlpark Commando / Regiment
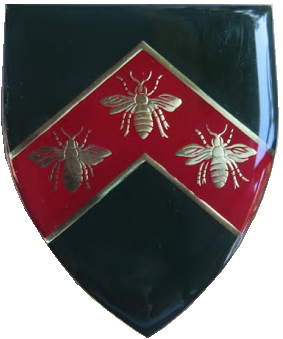
- Vanderbijlpark Commando and Regiment
- Active: 1961-
- Country: South Africa
- Allegiance: Republic of South Africa; Republic of South Africa
- Branch: South African Army; South African Army
- Type: Infantry
- Role: Light Infantry (Counter insurgency)
- Size: One Battalion
- Part of: South African Infantry Corps; Army Territorial Reserve
- Garrison/HQ: Vanderbijlpark
- Motto: Arma pacis fulcra (Arms are the supporters of peace)

Vanderbijlpark Regiment was a light infantry regiment of the South African Army. It formed part of the South African Army Infantry Formation as well as the South African Territorial Reserve.

== History ==
=== Origin ===
This unit was originally known as the Vaal/Vanderbijlpark Commando which itself had originated as a shooting commando in 1953 when it divided from the Vereeniging Commando. The Vanderbijlpark Commando was formally militarised in 1961 when all members received their Force Numbers and were placed in companies. From 1961 to 1969 the unit was responsible for the security of Vanderbijlpark and ISCOR, the Iron and Steel Corporation of South Africa facilities.

=== The daughter commando ===
The ISCOR Commando itself was formed in 1969 and the town was no longer its responsibility. The Vanderbijlpark Commando was now responsible for all other factories and installations in the larger district.

=== The Border War ===
The unit conducted its first border duty during 1976.

The unit received a new headquarters on 9 September 1978.

The unit received Freedom of Entry to Vanderbijlpark on 20 February 1982 and exercised its right.

=== From Commando to Regiment ===
The development of more industries in the area increased the responsibility on the Vanderbijlpark Commando as workers of these industries with Citizen Force Camp requirements were also transferred to the Vanderbijlpark Commando. The unit was officially reclassified as regiment on 31 January 1986, although a parade on 3 January 1986 through the streets of Vanderbijlpark allowed the public to interact with the new Regiment.

=== The counter-insurgency battalion ===
In 1986 a decision was made that the Regiment would also be utilised as a counter insurgency battalion and meant that it could be utilised in the black townships for riot control as well.

=== Command ===
The unit was initially under the command of Group 17 but was transferred to Group 42 in 1991, so that several units could be merged and be used in the greater Witwatersrand.

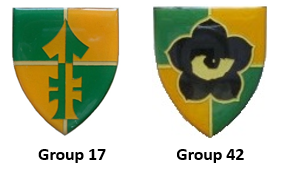
SADF Regiment Vanderbijlpark higher commands

== Leadership ==
Leadership
From	Honorary Colonels	To	Ribbon
	No known incumbents		
From	Commanding Officers	To	Ribbon
	No known incumbents		
From	Regimental Sergeants Major	To	Ribbon
	No known incumbents		

== Insignia ==
=== Dress Insignia ===
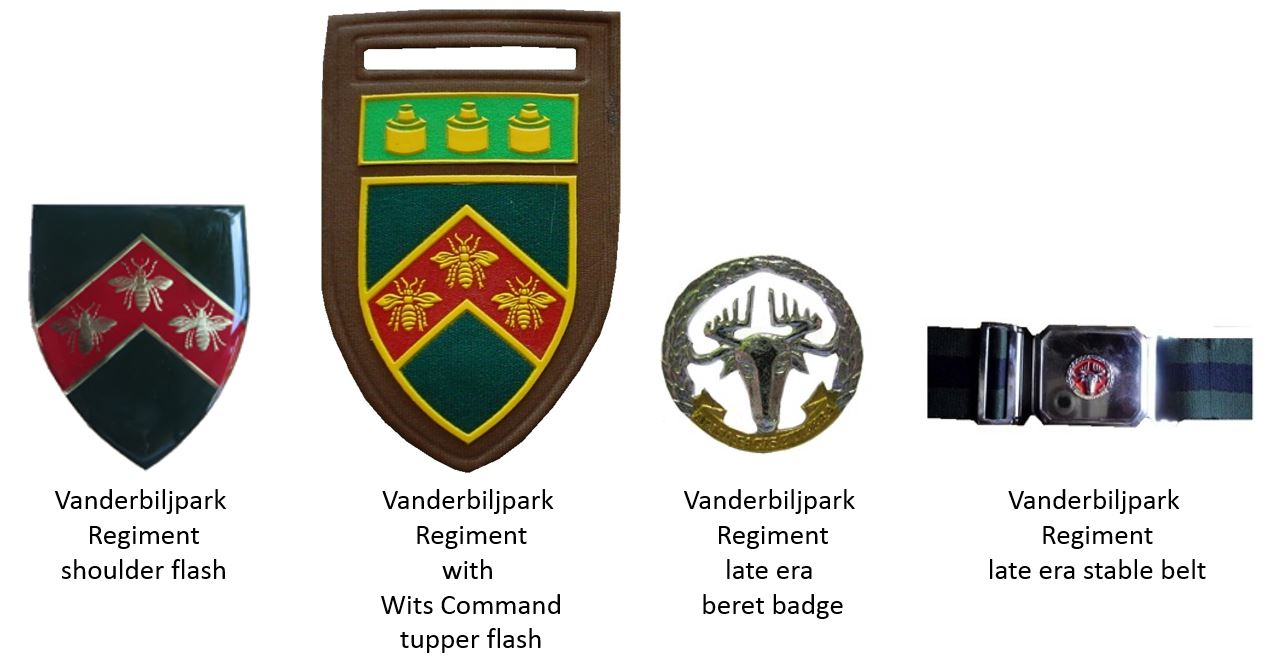
SADF era Vanderbiljpark Regiment insignia

== See also ==
- South African Commando System
