= Regiment Springs =

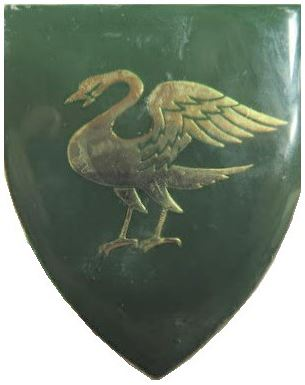
- Regiment Springs emblem
- Active: 1 March 1972 – 1996
- Allegiance: South Africa
- Branch: South African Army
- Size: Battalion
- Part of: South African Infantry Corps; Army Conventional Reserve
- Garrison/HQ: Springs, East Rand
- Battle honours

Regiment Springs was an infantry battalion of the South African Army. As a reserve force unit, it had a status roughly equivalent to that of a British Army Reserve or United States Army National Guard unit.

== History ==
=== Origin ===
Regiment Springs was formed in March 1972 and descended from Regiment Oos Rand as its 2nd Battalion, which in turn was raised in January 1964 in Benoni. The regiment was relocated to Springs and took its current name in March 1972.

=== Operations ===
Regiment Springs saw service on Internal Security duties and border duty.

=== Disbandment ===
The Regiment was disbanded in 1996.

== Regimental emblems ==
=== Dress Insignia ===
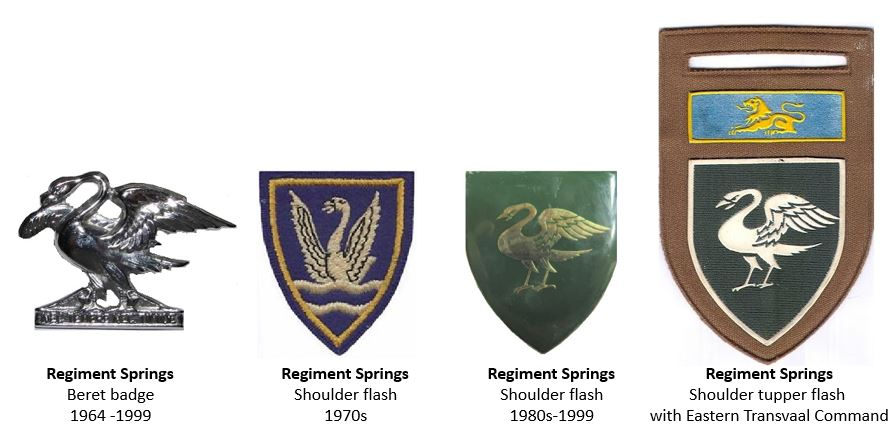
SADF Regiment Springs insignia
