= Commando System (South Africa) =

South African militia force

SADF Commando System
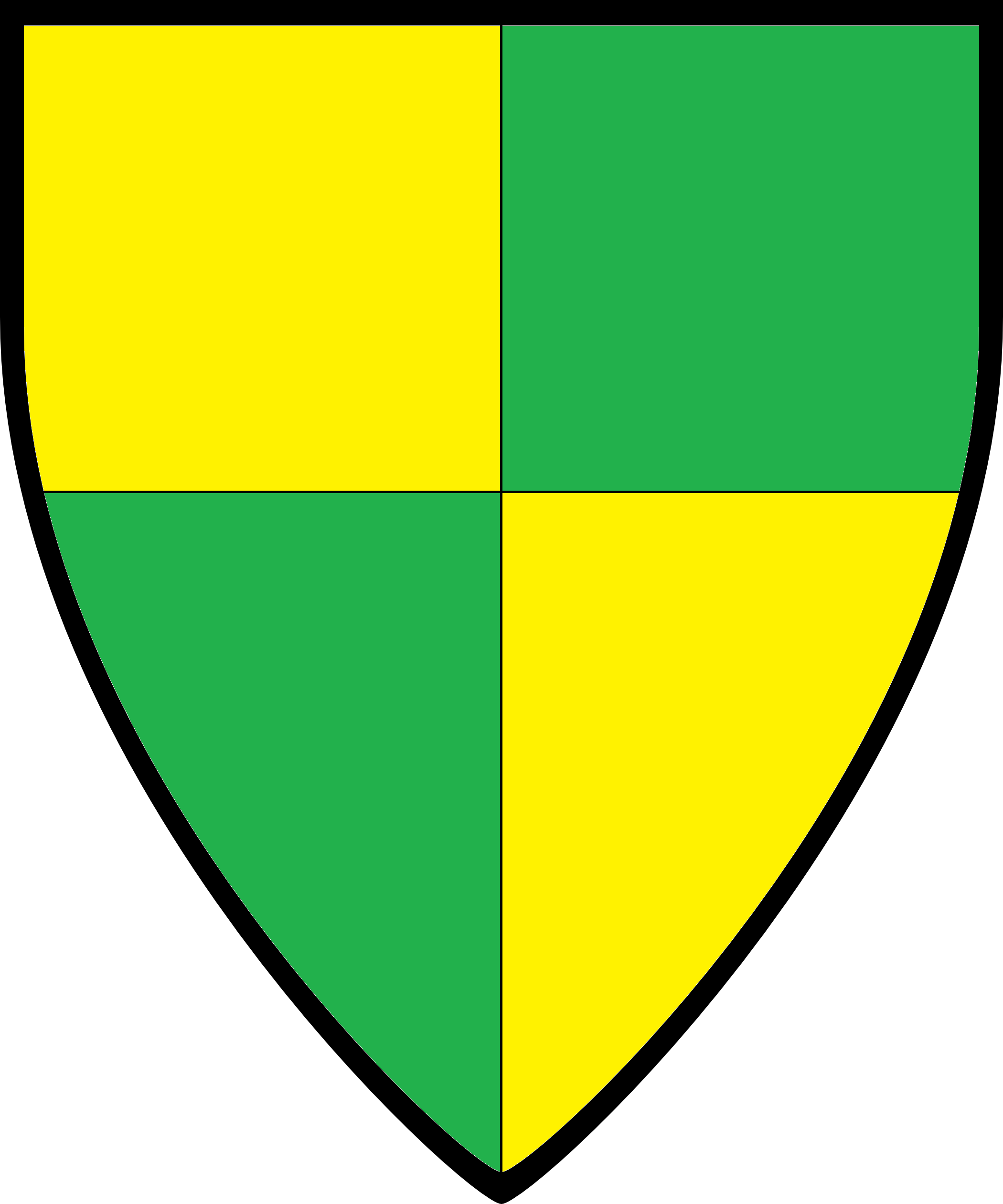
- Active: 1912–2003
- Country: South Africa
- Branch: South African Army
- Type: Area protection/Militia
- Role: Light infantry
- Part of: South African National Defence Force

Insignia
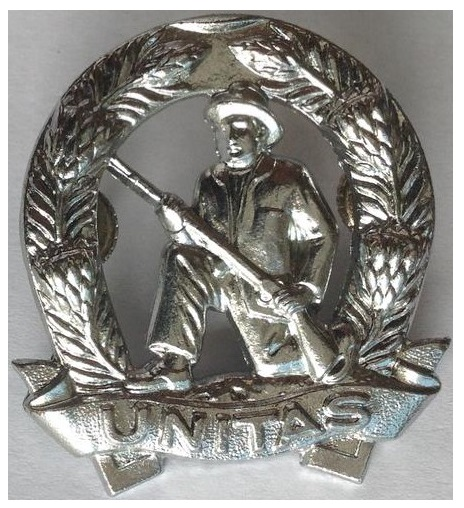
- SADF Commando Beret Badge

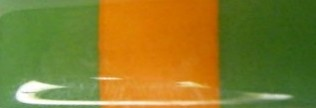
- SADF Commando Beret bar

- SADF Commando Shooting Competency

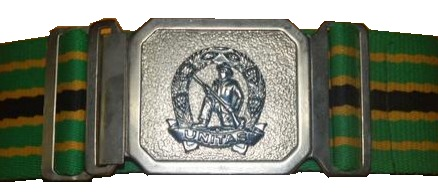
- SADF Commando Stable Belt

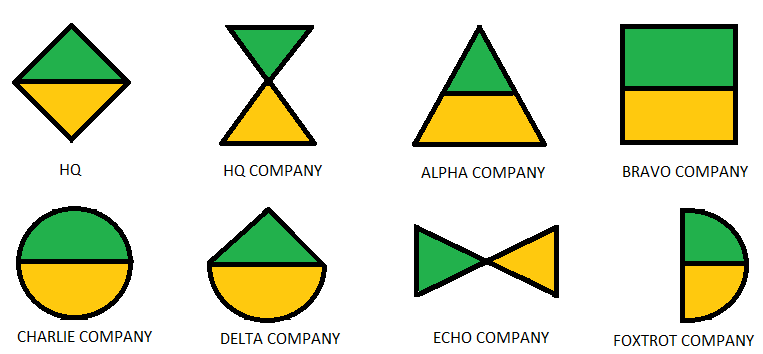
- SADF Commando Unit Company level flash

The Commando System was a mostly voluntary, part-time force of the South African Army, but in their role as local militia the units were often deployed in support of and under the authority of the South African Police.

== Mission ==
South Africa's Commando System was responsible for the safeguarding and protection of specific communities (usually rural, but sometimes urban). Commando units were usually referred to as area protection, a civil defence system which involved the whole community. The participants in the Commando System did not have military commitments outside of the areas they served and were responsible for the safety and security of their own communities.

== History ==
=== Origin ===
The Commando system existed from the 1770s. The early Boer Commando system was a conscriptive service designed to provide a quickly-trained fighting force.

Commandos were a product of the First Boer War during which the fiercely independent Boers had no regular army. When danger threatened, all the men in a district would form a militia organised into military units called commandos and would elect officers. Being civilian militia, each man wore what they wished, usually everyday neutral or earthtone khaki farming clothes such as a jacket, trousers and slouch hat. Each man brought his own weapon, usually a hunting rifle, and his own horses. The average Boer citizens who made up their commandos were farmers who had spent almost all their working life in the saddle, and because they had to depend on both their horse and their rifle for almost all of their meat, they were skilled hunters and expert marksmen. Most of the Boers had single-shot breech-loading rifles such as the Westley Richards, the Martini-Henry, or the Remington Rolling Block. Only a few had repeaters like the Winchester or the Swiss Vetterli. As hunters they had learned to fire from cover, from a prone position and to make the first shot count, knowing that if they missed the game would be long gone. At community gatherings, target shooting was a major sport and competitions used targets such as hens eggs perched on posts 100 yards away. The commandos became expert light cavalry, making use of every scrap of cover, from which they could pour an accurate and destructive fire at the British with their breech-loading rifles which could be rapidly aimed, fired, and reloaded.

At least during the Second Boer War each commando was attached to a town, after which it was named (e.g. Bloemfontein Commando). Each town was responsible for a district, divided into wards. The Commando was commanded by a Kommandant and each ward by a Veldkornet or field-cornet - equivalent of a senior NCO rank.

The Veldkornet was responsible not only for calling up the burghers, but also for policing his ward, collecting taxes, issuing firearms and other material in times of war. Theoretically, a ward was divided into corporalships. A corporalship was usually made up of about 20 burghers. Sometimes entire families filled a corporalship.

The Veldkornet was responsible to the Kommandant, who in turn was responsible to a General. In theory, a General was responsible for four commandos. He in turn was responsible to the Commander-in-Chief (CIC) of the Republic. In the Transvaal, the CIC was called the Commandant-General and in the Free State the Hoofdkommandant or Chief Commandant. The CIC was responsible to the President.

Other auxiliary ranks were created in war time, such as Vleiskorporaal ("meat corporal"), responsible for issuing rations.

== Commando system structure in the UDF, SADF and SANDF ==
In 1912, the commandos were reformed alongside the Active Citizen Force as part of the Union Defence Force and South African Defence Force. This system was in operation until in February 2003. By 1912, however previous Commando members could join shooting associations. By 1940, such commandos were under control of the National Reserve of Volunteers.

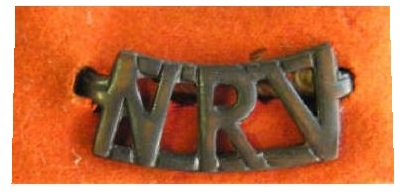
UDF era National Reserve of Volunteers shoulder tab

These commandos were formally reactivated by 1948.

=== Cell organisation ===
Each community was divided up into smaller more manageable sections called cells. Each cell comprised a number of farmers and or households, depending on the size of the area and dispersion of the area's inhabitants. Cell members were in contact with each other by means of telephone or a radio system (Marnet) which served as a backup communication system in the event of the telephone lines being out of order. Alternative communication systems were therefore a vital element of the protection plan of any cell. The cell members would have a communication link with their cell leader (who was elected by the members) who, in turn, had a communication link with the local police station. This ensured quick reaction by the police in the event of an attack. The cell leader could notify the local Commando if a stronger force was required.

This process of communication was time-consuming and, therefore, the members of a cell would be able to protect themselves and rely on support from neighbours and other members of the cell to ensure immediate response in an emergency. For this reason a cell would plan for certain contingencies before they happen. The local Commando would assist the cells with drawing up contingency plans.

"The farmer-commandos receive a few weekends of training as army reservists and are each given an assault rifle. When they respond to an incident, the police do, too. But the police force is stretched thin in farm areas, trying to cover vast areas with few officers or vehicles. The farmers often get there much sooner."

The retirement age of members of the commandos was 65 although it could be extended to 75 years.

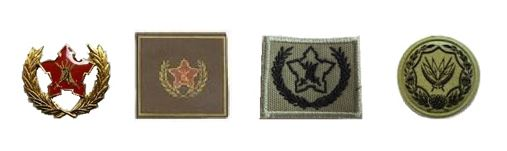
Voluntary Service Award (variations)

=== Commando organisation ===
Community cells were administered under distinct local commando units.

=== Group organisation ===
Several local commandos units were administered as Group units.

=== Command organisation ===
Several Groups, usually in a provincial context resorted under a Provincial Command.

=== Commando training ===
The Commando System had its own Commando Training School, where skills received from National Service were developed or sharpened.

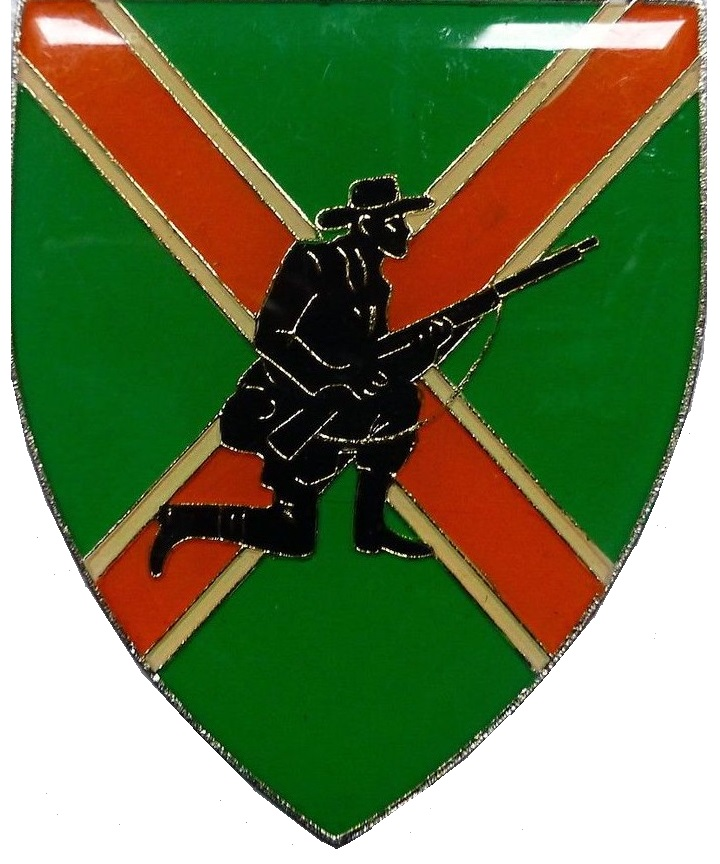
SADF Commando School Danie Theron

== Development of some Commando Units into regiments ==
As some commando units increased in size and functionality, it was decided to convert some of them to full Citizen Force regiments. Training for all commando units was based on the fundamental training of the infantry either motorised or mechanised. There were also other Citizen Force regiments that were artillery, armour, engineers etc. These Citizen Force units could then be equated to British army territorial regiments. Citizen Force regiments could be deployed anywhere. Some volunteered to do service in South West Africa and Angola but generally sent only small numbers. Some of these units that converted to Regiments included:

- Regiment Congella
- Regiment Hillcrest
- Regiment Highveld
- Regiment North Natal
- Regiment Pretorius
- Regiment Skoonspruit
- Regiment Springs
- Regiment Vanderbijlpark

== Weaponry ==
From the early days up until their disbandment, the commandos were issued with firearms by the government of the day. The burghers were obliged to keep these firearms serviceable and ready at all times.

== Group Headquarters Organisation ==
=== Under the SADF ===
Under the SADF, Commando units were grouped regionally under Commands: (Please note: This was not a wholly static structure and units could move occasionally between Groups, the diagrams below depict the structure from the late 1980s)

==== Western Province Command ====
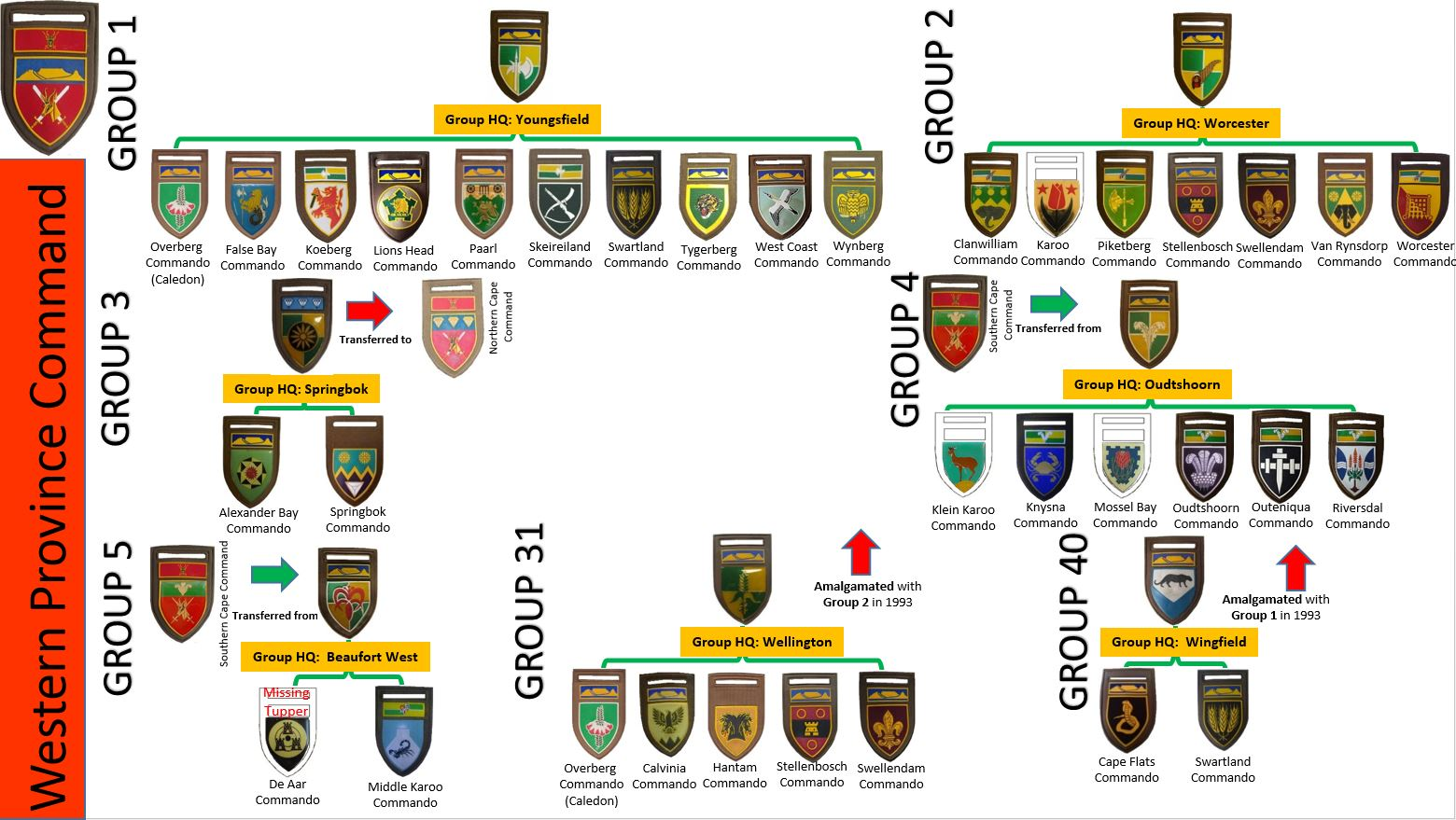
SADF era Western Province Command Commando structure

==== Southern Cape Command ====
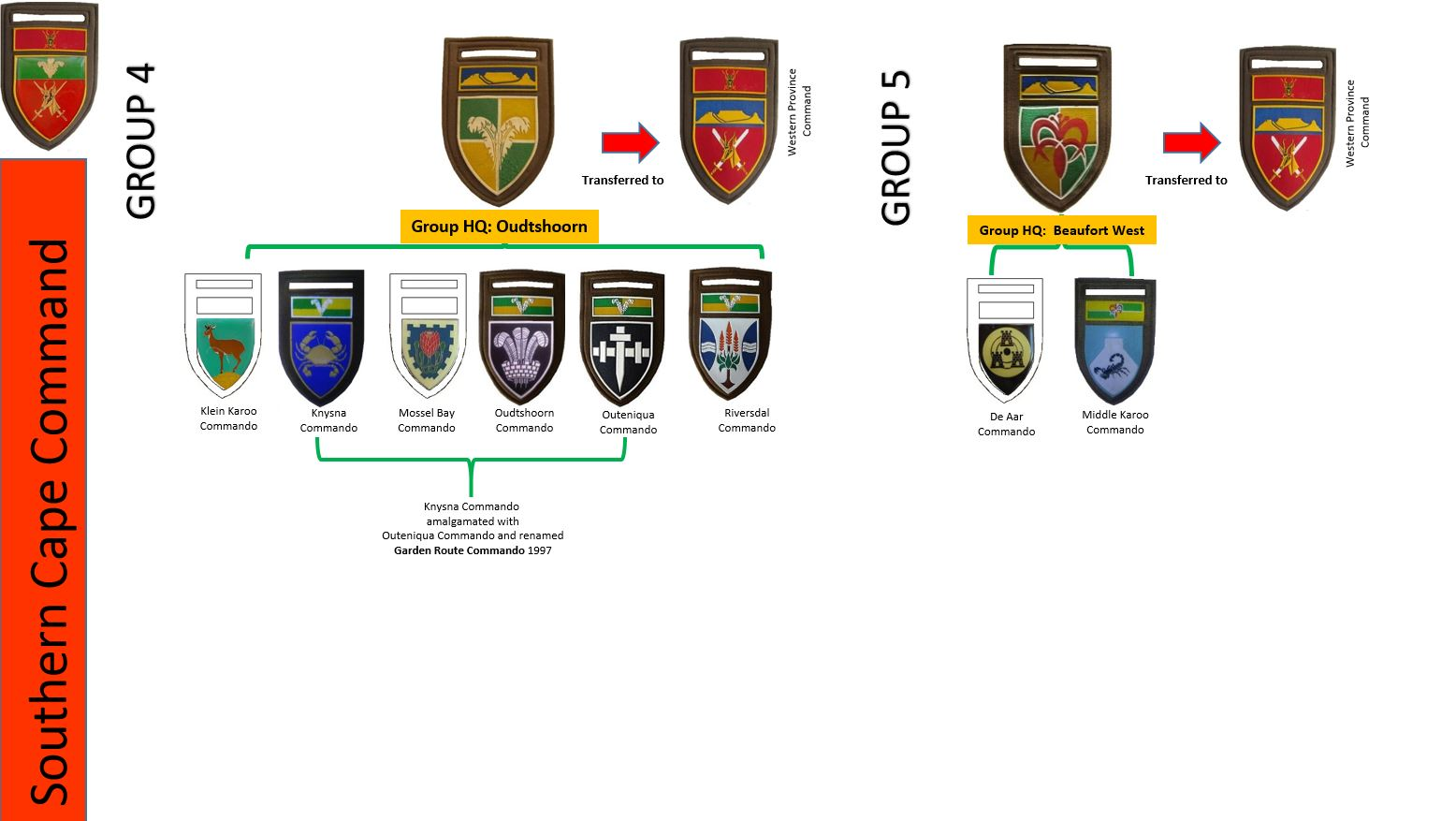
SADF era Southern Cape Command Commando Structure

==== Eastern Province Command ====
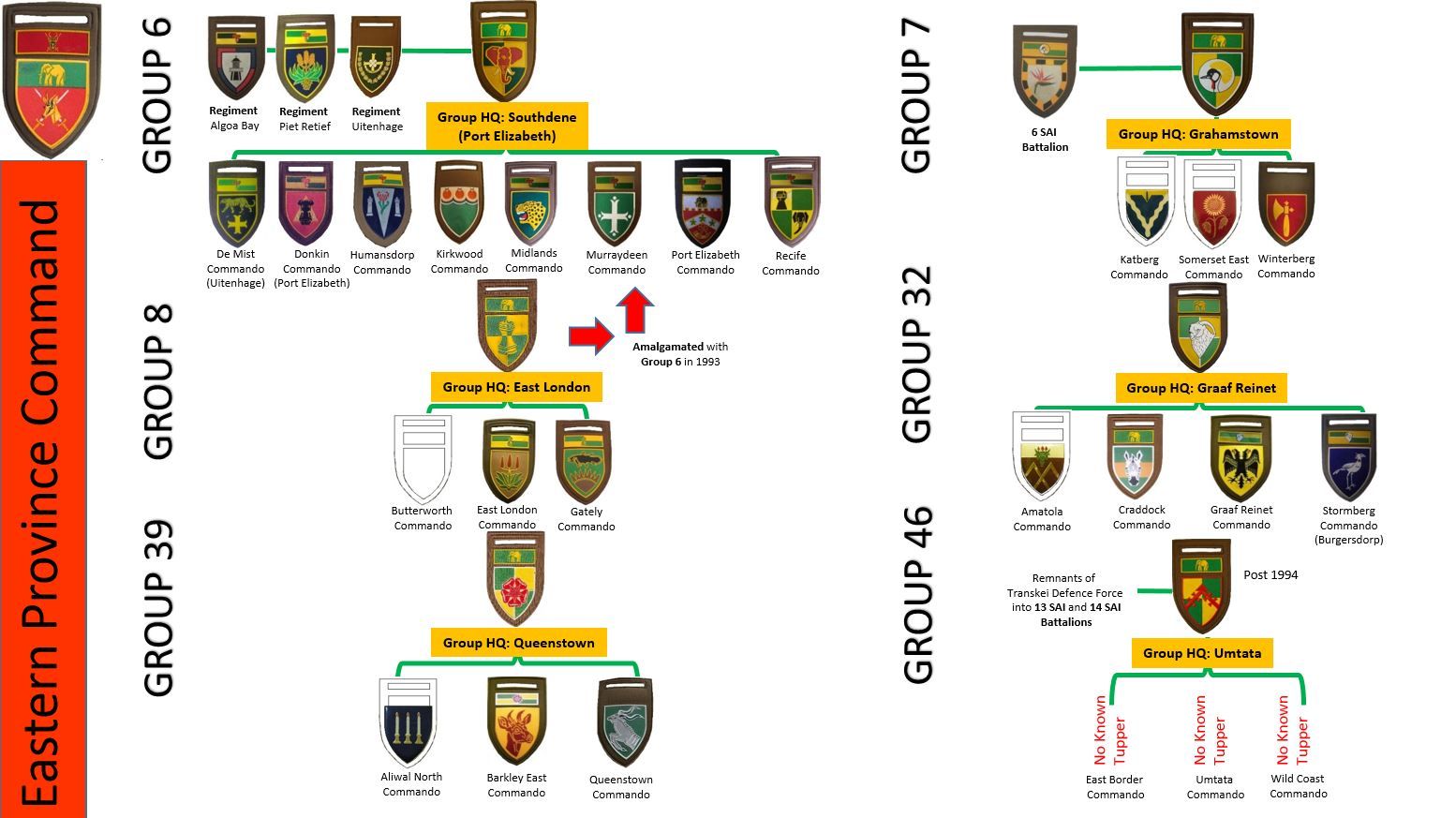
SADF era Eastern Province Command Commando structure

==== Northern Cape Command ====
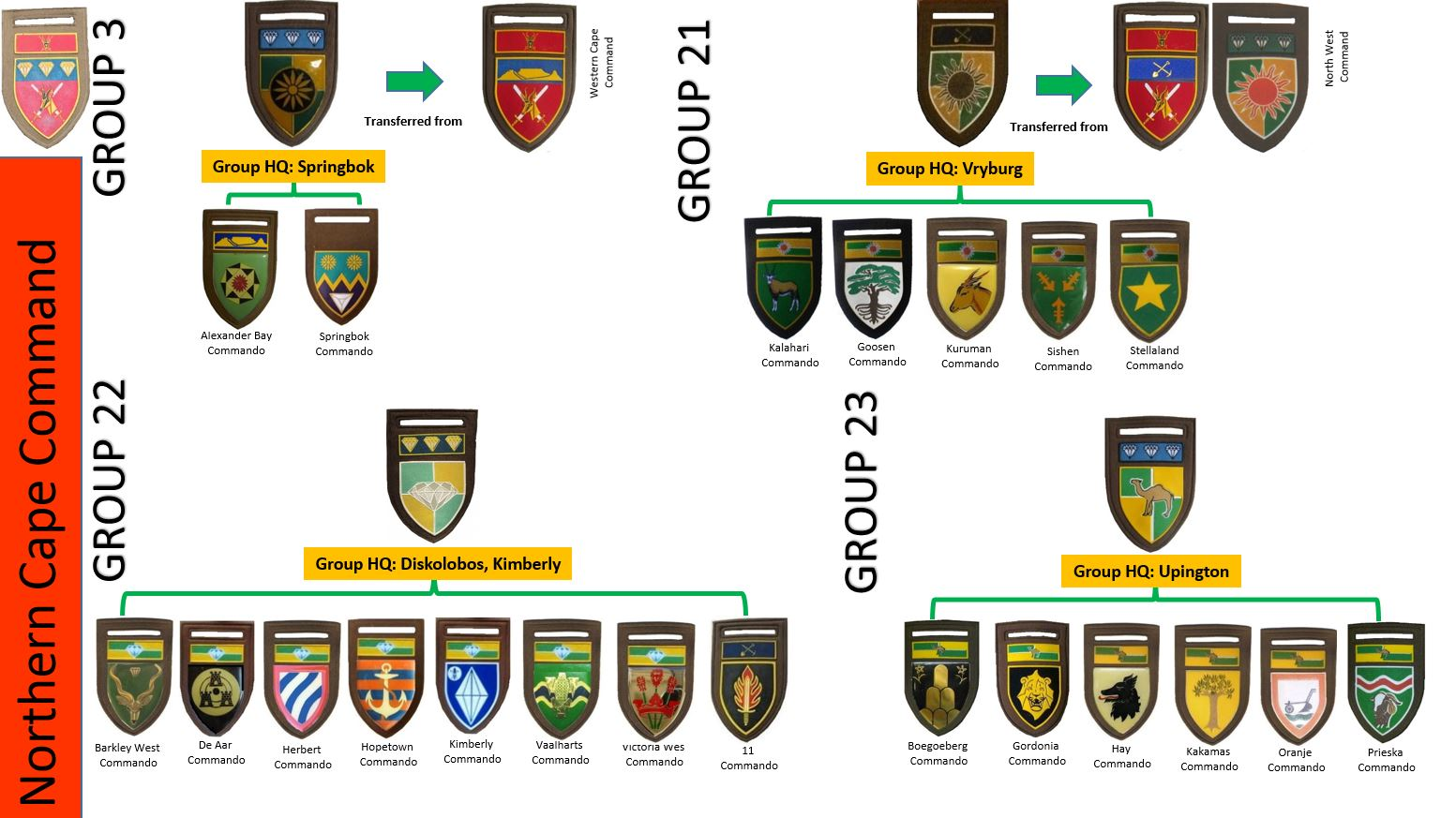
SADF era Northern Cape Command Commando Structure

==== Northwest Command ====
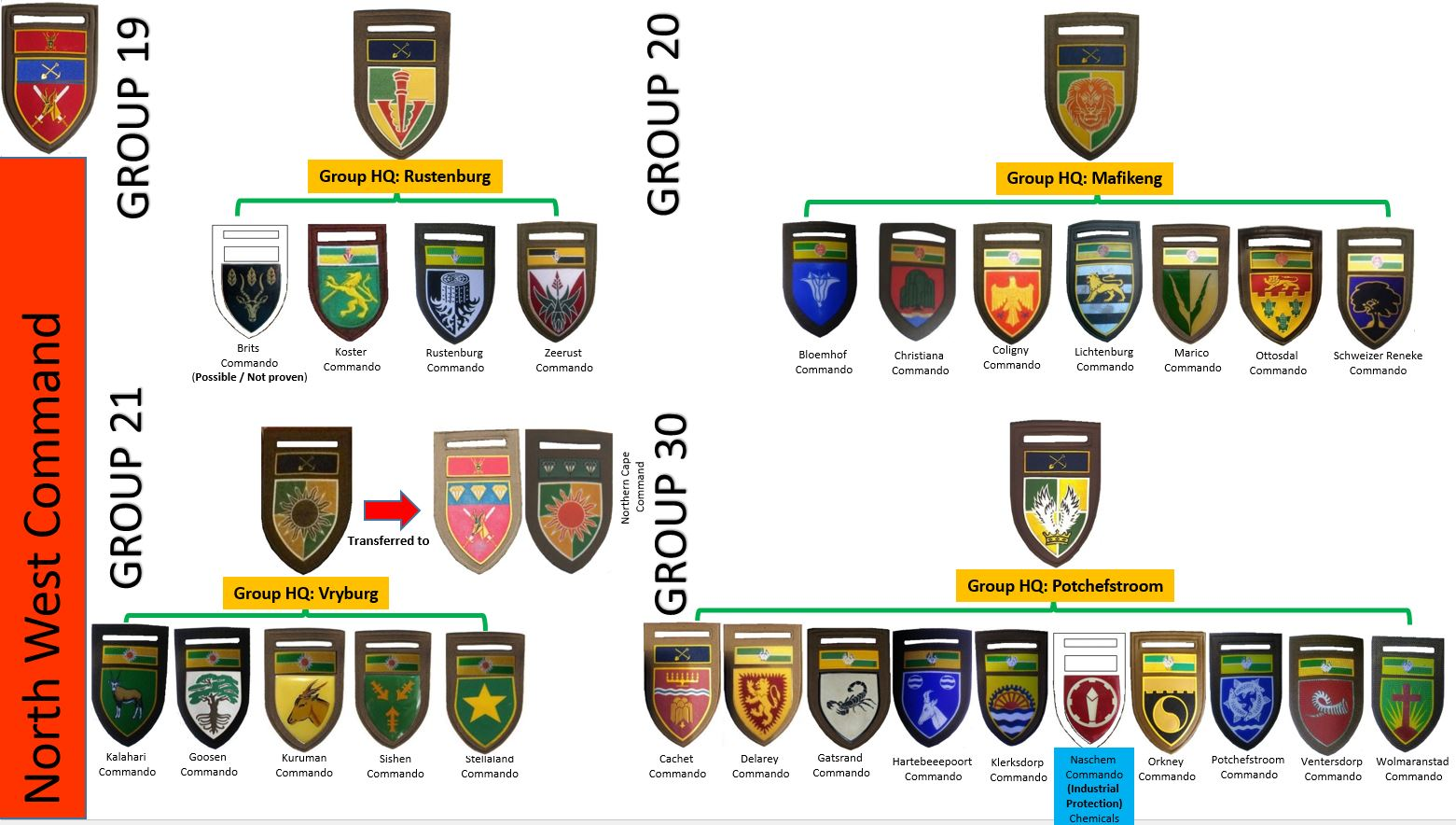
SADF era North west Command Commando structure

==== Orange Free State Command ====
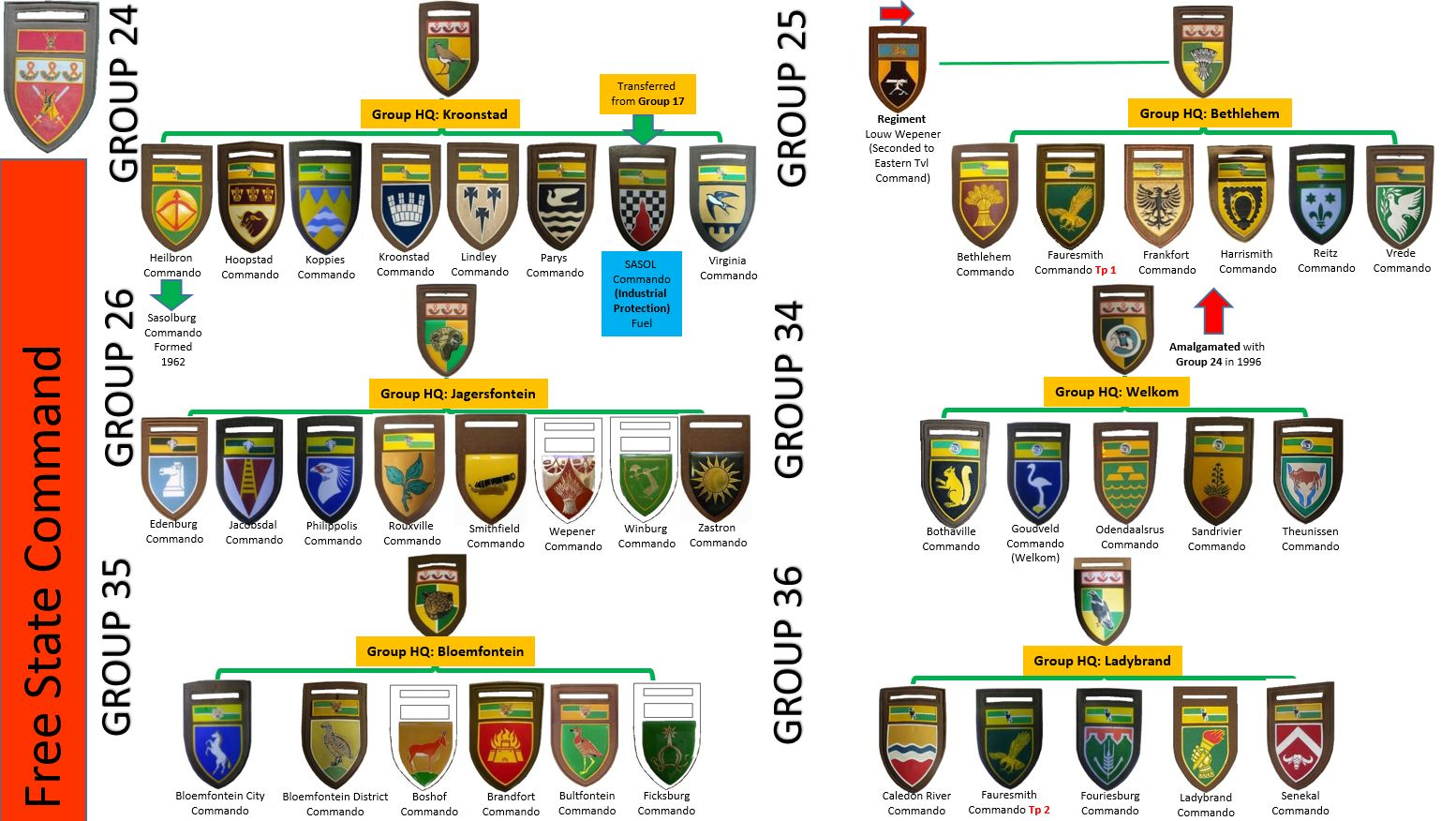
SADF era Free State Command Commando Structure

==== Natal Command ====
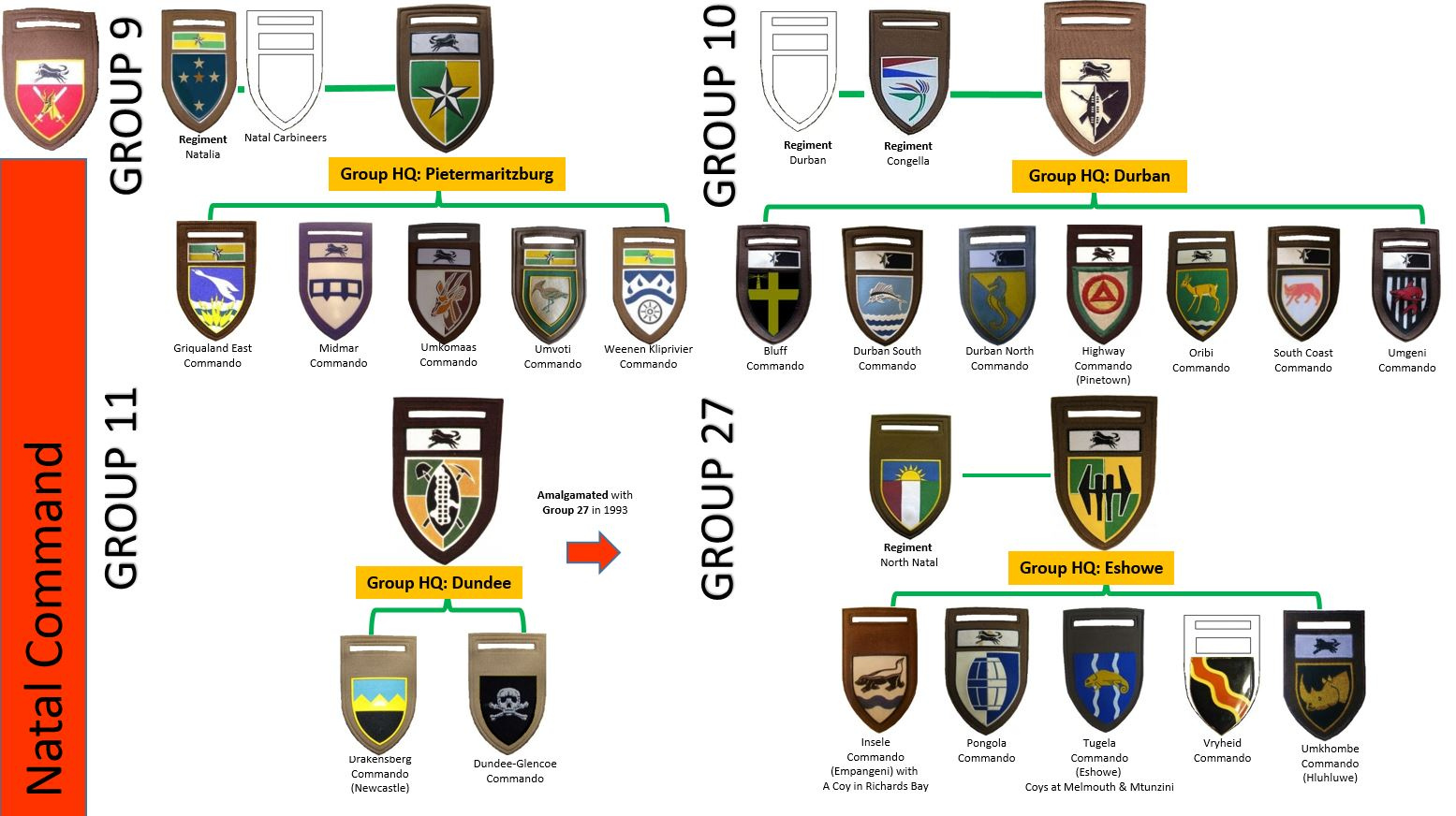
SADF era Natal Command Commando structure

==== Witwatersrand Command ====
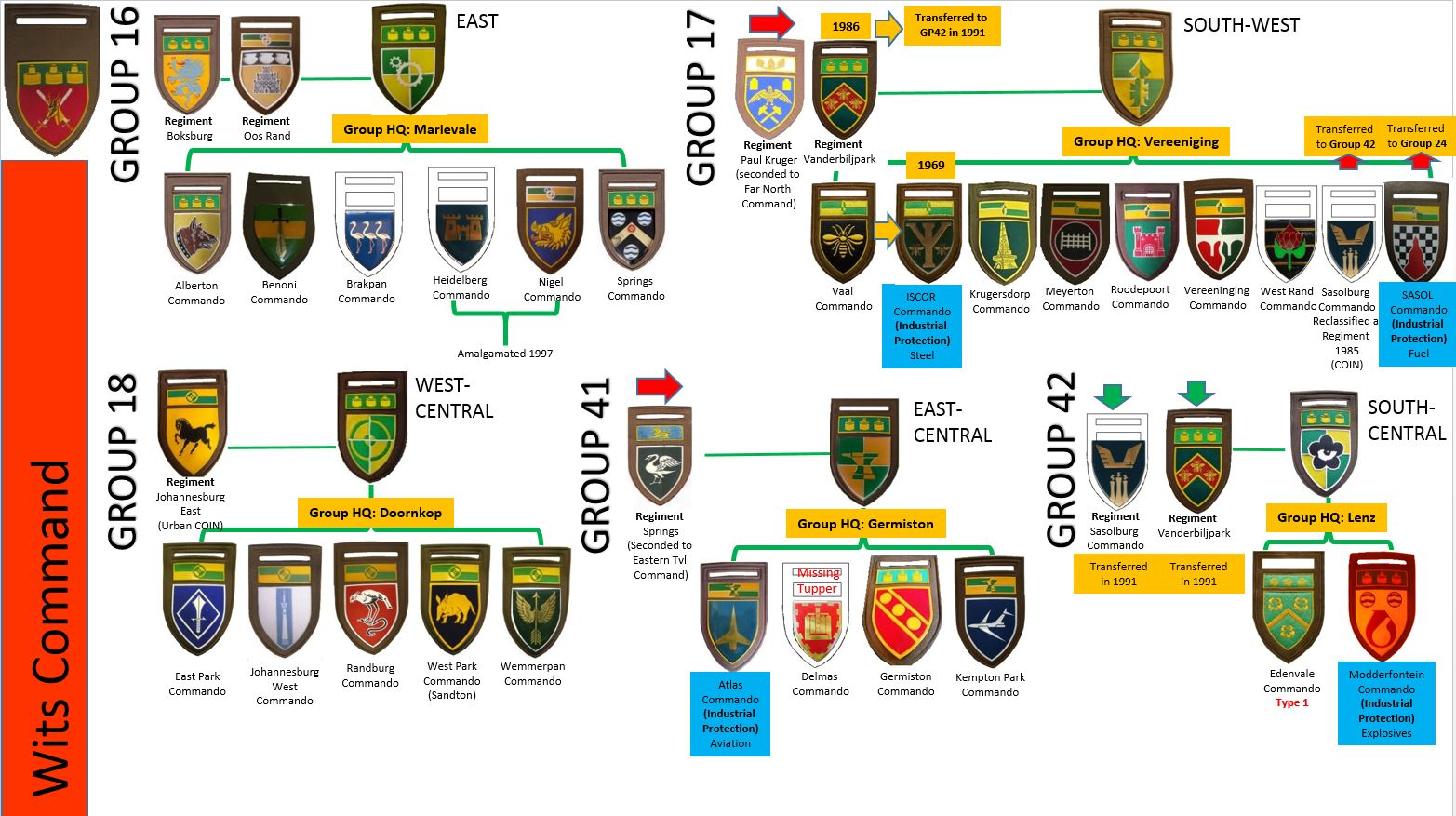
SADF era Wits Command Commando Structure

==== Northern Transvaal Command ====
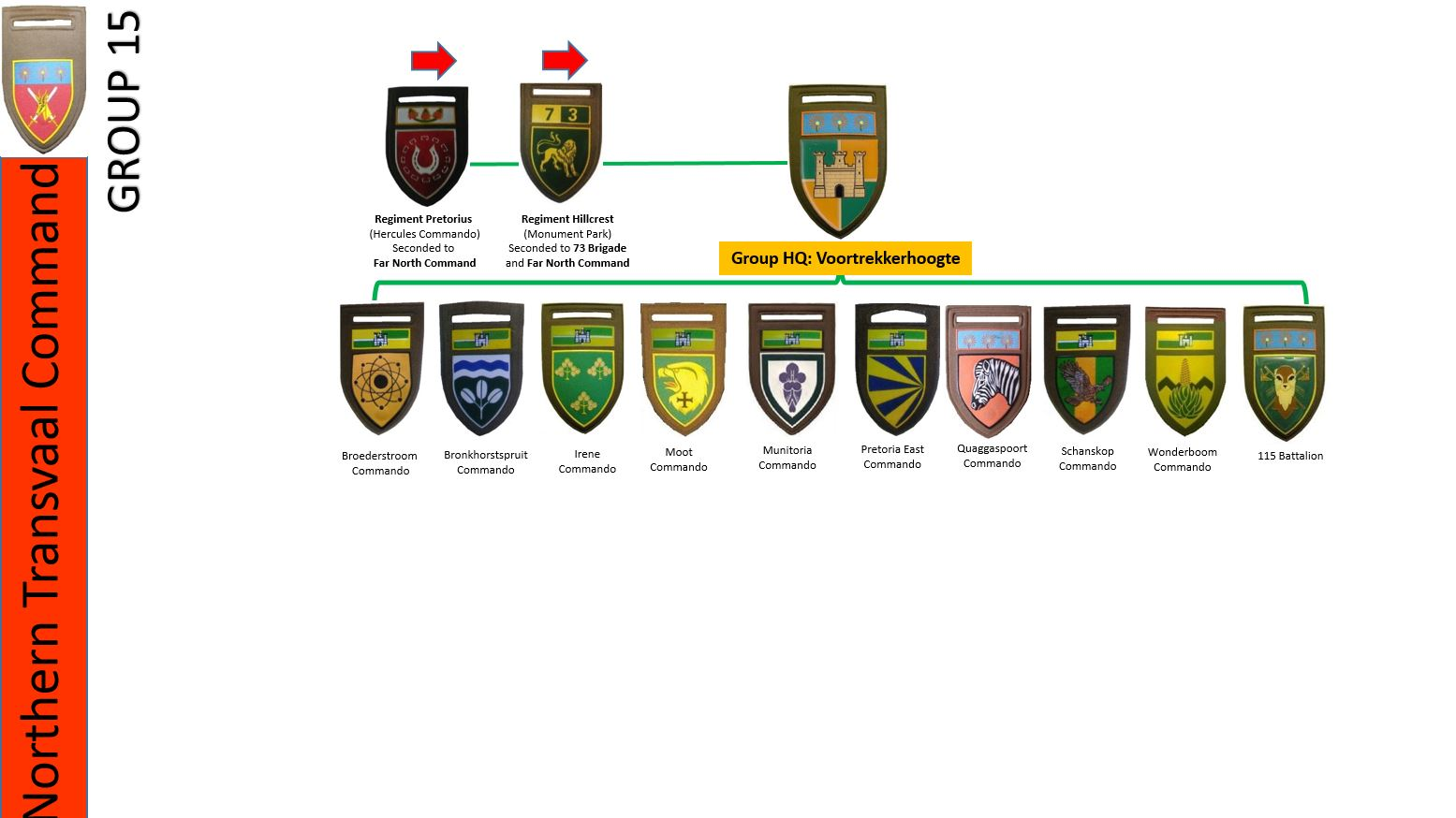
SADF era Northern Transvaal Command Commando Structure

==== Far North Command ====
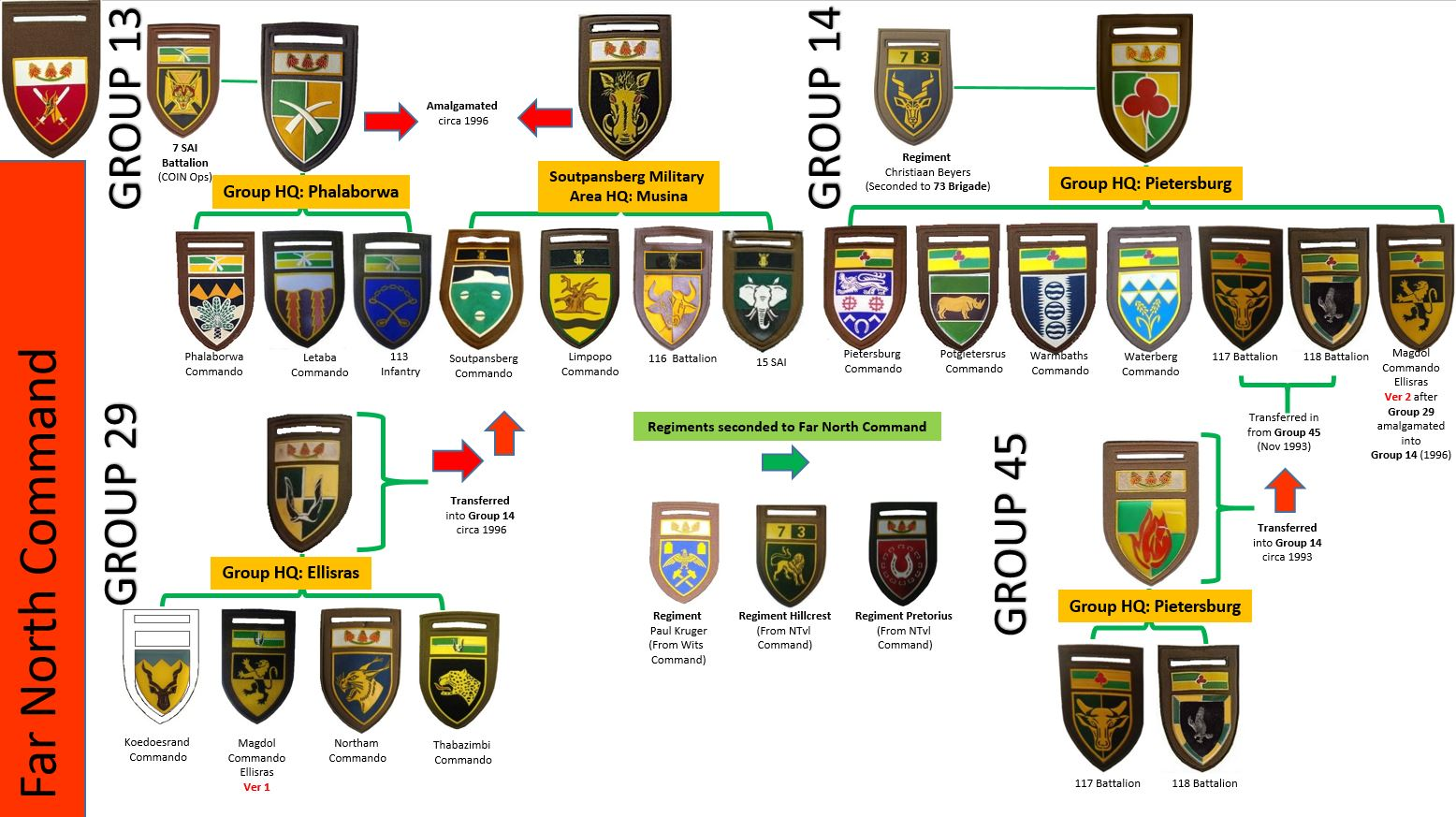
SADF era Far North Command Commando Structure

==== Eastern Transvaal Command ====
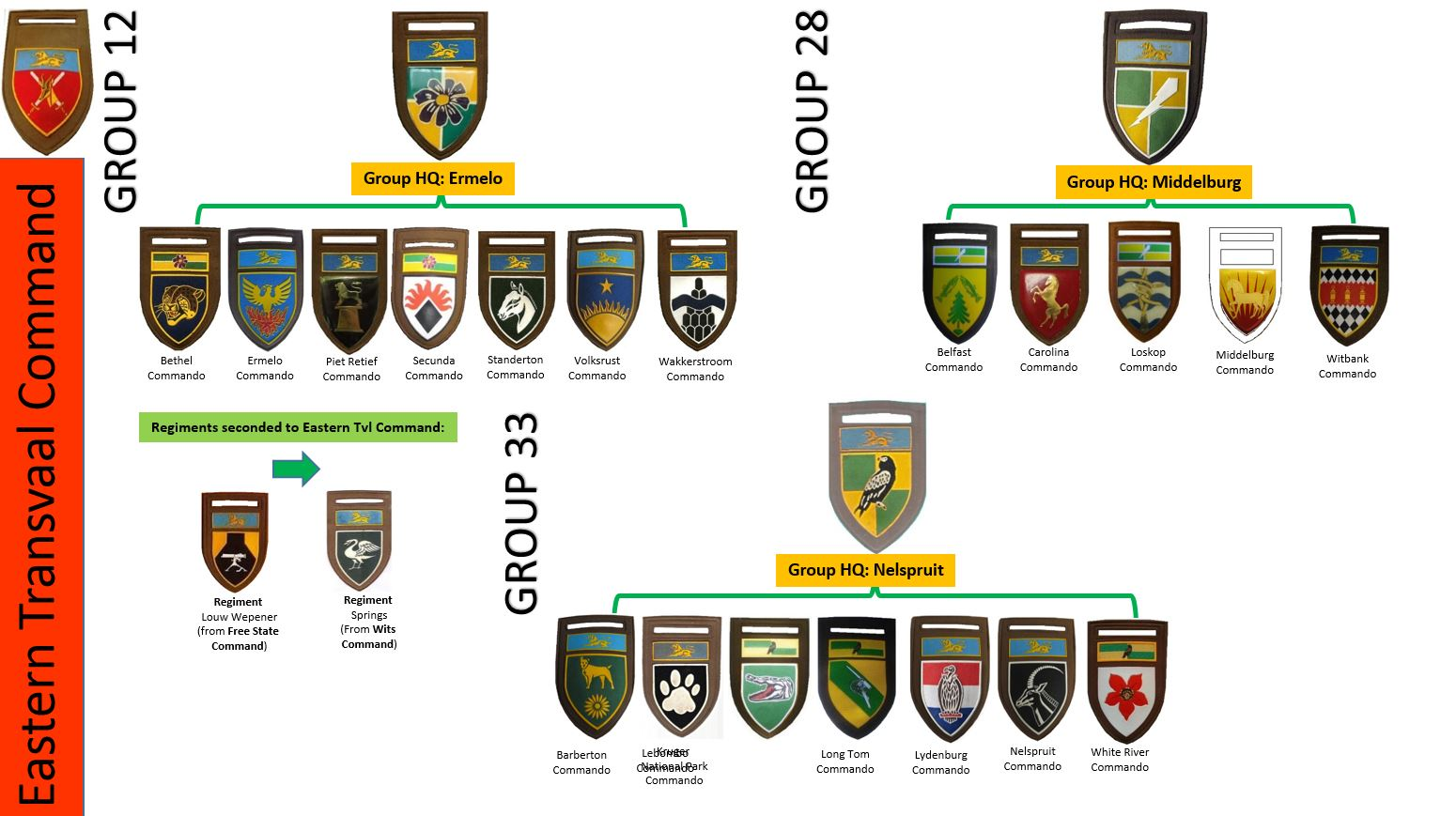
SADF era Eastern Transvaal Command Commando Structure

=== Under the SANDF ===
By 2005, after Army restructuring several groups became amalgamated under General Support Bases, GSBs. Group numbers therefore did not follow the original sequence.

Group	Headquarters	GSB	Number of commandos
1	Kelvin	GSB Youngsfield	10
2	Oudtshoorn	GSB Oudtshoorn	8
6	Port Elizabeth	GSB Port Elizabeth	15
8	East London	-	-
9	Pietermarizburg	GSB Durban	5
10	Montclair	GSB Durban	5
12	Ermelo	GSB Nelspruit	11
14	Pietersburg	GSB Pietersburg	7
15	Thaba Tshwane	GSB Thaba Tshwane	6
16	Marievale	GSB Johannesburg	8
18	Doornkop	GSB Johannesburg	11
20	Mabatho	GSB Potchefstroom	9
22	Diskobolos	GSB Kimberley	10
23	Upington	GSB Lohathla	7
24	Kroonstad	GSB Kroonstad	17
27	Eshowe	GSB Ladysmith	5
30	Potchefstroom	GSB Potchefstroom	12
33	Nelspruit	GSB Nelspruit	8
34	Welkom	-	4
35	Bloemfontein	-	-
36	Tempe	GSB Bloemfontein	16
46	Umtata	GSB Port Elizabeth	7

== Disbandment ==
On 14 February 2003, President Mbeki announced the disbanding of the commando system over six years, to be replaced by 'specialised police units'. The Democratic Alliance stated that this action would be a 'total disaster'.

Its spokesman, Armiston Watson said that "the disbanding of the rural commandos (announced by the government in 2003) was an irresponsible political move which now leaves all farmers and farm workers defenceless and easy targets for criminals."

Agri SA Chairman Kiewiet Ferreira, a farmer in the central Free State Province town of Harrismith said: "We need commandos, and we see them as one of the backbones of the rural protection plan, without a doubt" He also pointed out that, in 1998, former President Nelson Mandela included the commandos in a rural security plan, and "encouraged farmers, especially white farmers, to join the commandos and help in rural protection". "If you [take into account] how many operations commandos have been involved in, under the police - more than 50,000 operations in 2001 and 37,000 operations in 2002 (most of them road-blockades, foot patrols, vehicle patrols, farm visits, manning of observation posts) - that's nearly 90,000 operations in two years," Ferreira said.

There have been some acknowledgements by the current Army Command that the Commandos had a utility which is now lacking.

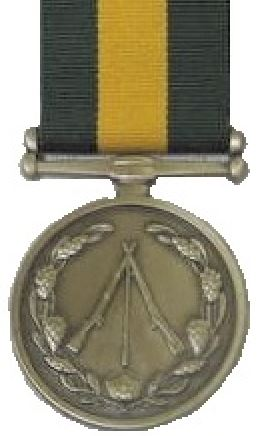
SANDF Commando Closure medal

The system was phased out between 2003 and 2008 "because of the role it played in the apartheid era", according to the Minister of Safety and Security Charles Nqakula. In 2005 then-Minister of Defence Mousioua Lekota explained that the process was "driven partly to counter racist elements within some of commandos, but also because of constitutional issues." This followed growing pressure after incidents of ongoing abuse of power were reported.

The disbandment of the Commando System has been blamed for South African farm attacks as police are unable to effectively protect vast rural areas as effectively as local Commando Units.

=== Closing down schedule ===
- 1 April 2004 to 31 March 2005: Group 36 in Bloemfontein and Group 46 in Mthata and seventeen commandos were closed down. Any remaining commandos of these Groups were transferred to Group 24 in Kroonstad and Group 6 in Port Elizabeth.
- 1 April 2005 to 31 March 2006: Groups 33 in Nelspruit with the Soutpansberg Military Area, Group 30 in Potchefstroom, Group 16 in Marievale, Group 22 in Kimberly with various commandos
- The last commando unit, Harrismith Commando based in the Free State, was disbanded in March 2008.

=== End status of commando members ===
At their peak 186 of these units, ranging in size from a company to a battalion, existed. The number of individual commando members varied according to different sources, but it is estimated that there were between 50,000 and 70,000. Data from the official army magazine SA Soldier of November 2005 states that at closure the composition of the Commandos were:

- African: 15134 members
- White: 32136 members
- Coloured: 4626 members
- Asian: 328 members

These members were given three options:

- Demobilise and no longer be a member of the SANDF
- Join the SAPS as a reservist
- Join the Army Conventional Reserve regiments if compliant to age and medical criteria and undergo conversion training.

== See also ==
- SWATF Area Force a similar system used in Southwest Africa
- South African National Defence Force
- Citizen Force
- Permanent Force
- Conscription in South Africa
